Clemson Tigers baseball represents Clemson University in college baseball at the NCAA Division I level.

2010

2011

Coaches

Schedule

! style="" | Regular Season
|- valign="top" 

|- bgcolor="ccffcc"
| February 18 ||  || Doug Kingsmore Stadium • Clemson, SC || W 14–3 || Weismann (1–0) || Lewis (0–1) || None || 6,138 || 1–0 ||
|- bgcolor="ffbbb"
| February 19 || Eastern Michigan || Doug Kingsmore Stadium • Clemson, SC || L 6–7 || Chaffins (1–0) || Pohle (0–1) || None || 5,407 || 1–1 ||
|- bgcolor="ccffcc"
| February 20 || Eastern Michigan || Doug Kingsmore Stadium • Clemson, SC || W 5–1 || Brady (1–0) || Weber (0–1) || Haselden (1) || 3,985 || 2–1 ||
|- bgcolor="ccffcc"
| February 25 ||  || Doug Kingsmore Stadium • Clemson, SC || W 15–4 || Weisman (2–0) || Mergen (0–1) || None || 4,804 || 3–1 ||
|- bgcolor="ccffcc"
| February 26 ||  || Doug Kingsmore Stadium • Clemson, SC || W 19–1 || Haselden (1–0) || Markham (1–1) || None || 5,089 || 4–1 ||
|- bgcolor="ccffcc"
| February 27 ||  || Fluor Field at the West End • Greenville, SC || W 8–0 || Brady (2–0) || Waszak (1–1) || None || 4,287  || 5–1 ||
|-

|- bgcolor="ccffcc"
| March 2 ||  || Doug Kingsmore Stadium • Clemson, SC || W 5–1 || Pohle (1–1) || White (0–1) || None || 3,833 || 6–1 ||
|- bgcolor="ffbbb"
| March 4 || at South Carolina || Carolina Stadium • Columbia, SC || L 3–6 || Roth (3–0) || Weismann (2–1) || Price (3) || 8,242 || 6–2 ||
|- bgcolor="ccffcc"
| March 6 || South Carolina || Doug Kingsmore Stadium • Clemson, SC || W 10–5 || Moorefield (1–0) || Price (0–1) || None || 6,320 || 7–2 ||
|- bgcolor="ffbbb"
| March 8 || vs South Carolina || Fluor Field at the West End • Greenville, SC || L 4–5 || Koumas (1–0) || Frederick (0–1) || Price (4) || 7,125 || 7–3 ||
|- bgcolor="ffbbb"
| March 11 || Virginia || Doug Kingsmore Stadium • Clemson, SC || L 0–5 || Hultzen (4) || Weismann (2–2) || None || 4,051 || 7–4 || 0–1
|- bgcolor="ffbbb"
| March 12 || Virginia || Doug Kingsmore Stadium • Clemson, SC || L 7–8 || Mayberry (3–0) || Frederick (0–2) || Kline (6) || 5,374 || 7–5 || 0–2
|- bgcolor="ffbbb"
| March 13 || Virginia || Doug Kingsmore Stadium • Clemson, SC || L 6–7 || Hunt (1–0) || Haselden (1–1) || Kline (7) || 4,009 || 7–6 || 0–3
|- bgcolor="ffbbb"
| March 16 ||  || Fluor Field at the West End • Greenville, SC || L 3–4 || Knox (2–1) || Sarratt (0–1) || None || 1,851 || 7–7 ||
|- bgcolor="ccffcc"
| March 18 ||  || Doug Kingsmore Stadium • Clemson, SC || W 9–6 || Meyer (1–0) || Van Orden (2–3) || Frederick (1) || 4,166 || 8–7 || 1–3
|- bgcolor="ccffcc"
| March 19 || Duke || Doug Kingsmore Stadium • Clemson, SC || W 16–7 || Pohle (2–1) || Pfisterer (1–1) || None || 4,315 || 9–7 || 2–3
|- bgcolor="ccffcc"
| March 20 || Duke || Doug Kingsmore Stadium • Clemson, SC || W 9–3 || Firth (1–0) || Stroman (1–1) || None || 3,794 || 10–7 || 3–3
|- bgcolor="ccffcc"
| March 22 ||  || Doug Kingsmore Stadium • Clemson, SC || W 7–2 || Sarratt (1–1) || Girdwood (2–2) || None || 3,478 || 11–7 ||
|- bgcolor="ccffcc"
| March 23 || Elon || Doug Kingsmore Stadium • Clemson, SC || W 9–2 || Lamb (1–0) || Fisher (0–1) || None || 3,302 || 12–7 ||
|- bgcolor="ffbbb"
| March 25 || at  || Doak Field • Raleigh, NC || L 0–6 || Mazzoni (2–2) || Weismann (2–3) || None || 1,176 || 12–8 || 3–4
|- bgcolor="ffbbb"
| March 26 || at NC State || Doak Field • Raleigh, NC || L 3–5 || Chamra (4–0) || Leone (0–1) || Overman (1) || 967 || 12–9 || 3–5
|- bgcolor="ccffcc"
| March 27 || at NC State || Doak Field • Raleigh, NC || W 7–3 || Firth (2–0) || Healey (1–3) || Frederick (2) || 810 || 13–9 || 4–5
|- bgcolor="ccffcc"
| March 29 ||  || Doug Kingsmore Stadium • Clemson, SC || W 11–5 || Pohle (3–1) || Boling (0–2) || None || 3,942 || 14–9 ||
|-

|- bgcolor="ffbbb"
| April 1 || at North Carolina || Boshamer Stadium • Chapel Hill, NC || L 3–13 || P. Johnson (6–0) || Weismann (2–4) || None || 1,386 || 14–10 || 4–6
|- bgcolor="ffbbb"
| April 2 || at North Carolina || Boshamer Stadium • Chapel Hill, NC || L 5–9 || Morin (2–1) || Moorefield (1–1) || None || 3,014 || 14–11 || 4–7
|- bgcolor="ffbbb"
| April 3 || at North Carolina || Boshamer Stadium • Chapel Hill, NC || L 4–5 || Penny (1–0) || Lamb (1–1) || None || 2,912 || 14–12 || 4–8
|- bgcolor="ccffcc"
| April 5 ||  || Doug Kingsmore Stadium • Clemson, SC || W 5–410 || Haselden (2–1) || Coons (1–3) || None || 3,450 || 15–12 ||
|- bgcolor="ccffcc"
| April 6 ||  || Doug Kingsmore Stadium • Clemson, SC || W 12–3 || Weismann (3–4) || Curtis (1–2) || None || 3,482 || 16–12 ||
|- bgcolor="ccffcc"
| April 8 ||  || Doug Kingsmore Stadium • Clemson, SC || W 12–3 || Meyer (2–0) || Carroll (5–2) || None || 4,119 || 17–12 || 5–8
|- bgcolor="ccffcc"
| April 9 || Maryland || Doug Kingsmore Stadium • Clemson, SC || W 7–0 || Firth (3–0) || Potter (2–4) || Haselden (2) || 5,074 || 18–12 || 6–8
|- bgcolor="ffbbb"
| April 10 || Maryland || Doug Kingsmore Stadium • Clemson, SC || L 6–7 || Wacker (2–1) || Frederick (0–3) || None || 4,537 || 18–13 || 6–9
|- bgcolor="ccffcc"
| April 12 ||  || Doug Kingsmore Stadium • Clemson, SC || W 7–2 || Sarratt (2–1) || Richardson (4–3) || None || 3,323 || 19–13 ||
|- bgcolor="ccffcc"
| April 15 || at  || Eddie Pellagrini Diamond at John Shea Field • Chestnut Hill, MA || W 9–2 || Leone (1–1) || Bayuk (3–4) || None || 477 || 20–13 || 7–9
|- bgcolor="ccffcc"
| April 16 || at Boston College || Eddie Pellagrini Diamond at John Shea Field • Chestnut Hill, MA || W 7–5 || Haselden (3–1) || Leonard (4–4) || Frederick (3) ||  || 21–13 || 8–9
|- bgcolor="ccffcc"
| April 16 || at Boston College || Eddie Pellagrini Diamond at John Shea Field • Chestnut Hill, MA || W 9–2 || Meyer (3–0) || Alvarez (0–1) || None || 1,342 || 22–13 || 9–9
|- bgcolor="ccffcc"
| April 20 || at  || Foley Field • Athens, GA || W 5–2 || Sarratt (3–1) || Cornwell (1–3) || Weismann (1) || 2,297 || 23–13 ||
|- bgcolor="ccffcc"
| April 22 ||  || Doug Kingsmore Stadium • Clemson, SC || W 2–0 || Leone (2–1) || Holmes (2–3) || Weismann (2) || 4,685 || 24–13 || 10–9
|- bgcolor="ffbbb"
| April 23 || Wake Forest || Doug Kingsmore Stadium • Clemson, SC || L 3–9 || Cooney (5–2) || Firth (3–1) || None || 5,280 || 24–14 || 10–10
|- bgcolor="ccffcc"
| April 24 || Wake Forest || Doug Kingsmore Stadium • Clemson, SC || W 10–4 || Meyer (4–0) || Stadler (1–7) || None || 4,112 || 25–14 || 11–10
|- bgcolor="ccffcc"
| April 26 ||  || Doug Kingsmore Stadium • Clemson, SC || W 5–0 || Sarratt (4–1) || Gottlieb (0–2) || None || 3,298 || 26–14 ||
|- bgcolor="ccffcc"
| April 27 || at Western Carolina || Hennon Stadium • Cullowhee, NC || W 6–48 || Haselden (4–1) || McKinney (0–1) || Meyer (1) || 529 || 27–14 ||
|- bgcolor="ccffcc"
| April 29 ||  || Doug Kingsmore Stadium • Clemson, SC || W 4–2 || Leone (3–1) || Pope (9–2) || Weismann (3) || 4,706 || 28–14 || 12–10
|- bgcolor="ffbbb"
| April 30 || Georgia Tech || Doug Kingsmore Stadium • Clemson, SC || L 1–5 || Bradley (5–2) || Meyer (4–1) || None || 5,377 || 28–15 || 12–11
|-

|- bgcolor="ccffcc"
| May 1 ||  || Doug Kingsmore Stadium • Clemson, SC || W 3–1 || Sarratt (5–1) || Farmer (7–2) || Weismann (4) || 4,419 || 29–15 || 13–11
|- bgcolor="ccffcc"
| May 7 ||  || Doug Kingsmore Stadium • Clemson, SC || W 13–1 || Leone (4–1) || Papelow (3–2) || None || || 30–15 ||
|- bgcolor="ccffcc"
| May 7 || Gardner–Webb || Doug Kingsmore Stadium • Clemson, SC || W 12–0 || Meyer (5–1) || Heiligenstadt (3–4) || None || 5,151 || 31–15 ||
|- bgcolor="ccffcc"
| May 8 || at Gardner–Webb || John Henry Moss Stadium • Boiling Springs, NC || W 5–1 || Sarratt (6–1) || Pagan (3–2) || None || 1,328 || 32–15 ||
|- bgcolor="ccffcc"
| May 10 || at  || Fluor Field at the West End • Greenville, SC || W 5–1 || Firth (4–1) || Friedman (1–3) || Campbell (1) || 3,526 || 33–15 ||
|- bgcolor="ccffcc"
| May 11 ||  || Doug Kingsmore Stadium • Clemson, SC || W 8–3 || Pohle (4–1) || Freeman (3–3) || None || 1,421 || 34–15 ||
|- bgcolor="ccffcc"
| May 14 || at  || English Field • Blacksburg, VA || W 7–2 || Leone (5–1) || Mantiply (5–7) || None ||  || 35–15 || 14–11
|- bgcolor="ccffcc"
| May 14 || at Virginia Tech || English Field • Blacksburg, VA || W 8–3 || Moorefield (2–1) || Zecchino (5–5) || Campbell (2) || 713 || 36–15 || 15–11
|- bgcolor="ffbbb"
| May 15 || at Virginia Tech || English Field • Blacksburg, VA || L 2–3 || Parsons (7–2) || Meyer (5–2) || Martir (2) || 943 || 36–16 || 15–12
|- bgcolor="ccffcc"
| May 17 ||  || Doug Kingsmore Stadium • Clemson, SC || W 19–0 || Pohle (5–1) || Russell (2–4) || None || 3,396 || 37–16 ||
|- bgcolor="ffbbb"
| May 19 || at  || Mike Martin Field at Dick Howser Stadium • Tallahassee, FL || L 6–8 || Gilmartin (10–1) || Leone (5–2) || Bennett (12) || 4,692 || 37–17 || 15–13
|- bgcolor="ccffcc"
| May 20 || at Florida State || Mike Martin Field at Dick Howser Stadium • Tallahassee, FL || W 7–4 || Sarratt (7–1) || Benincasa (2–1) || Weismann (5) || 4,973 || 38–17 || 16–13
|- bgcolor="ccffcc"
| May 21 || at Florida State || Mike Martin Field at Dick Howser Stadium • Tallahassee, FL || W 8–5 || Haselden (5–1) || McGee (2–3) || Weismann (6) || 4,761 || 39–17 || 17–13
|-

|-
! style="" | Post-Season
|- 

|- bgcolor="ccffcc"
| May 25 ||  || Durham Bulls Athletic Park • Durham, NC || W 9–0 || Leone (6–2) || Pope (11–4) || Haselden (3) || 1,571 || 40–17 || 1–0
|- bgcolor="ffbbb"
| May 26 ||  || Durham Bulls Athletic Park • Durham, NC || L 3–6 || Gilmartin (11–1) || Sarratt (7–2) || Bennett (13) || 2,416 || 40–18 || 1–1
|- bgcolor="ccffcc"
| May 28 ||  || Durham Bulls Athletic Park • Durham, NC || W 6–3 || Campbell (1–0) || Rice (1–1) || Weismann (7) || 4,255 || 41–18 || 2–1
|-

|- bgcolor="ccffcc"
| June 3 || (4)  || Doug Kingsmore Stadium • Clemson, SC || W 11–1 || Firth (5–1) || Scribner (9–3) || None || 5,194 || 42–18 || 1–0
|- bgcolor="ccffcc"
| June 4 ||  || Doug Kingsmore Stadium • Clemson, SC || W 12–7 || Haselden (6–1) || Hessler (2–3) || None || 5,408 || 43–18 || 2–0
|- bgcolor="ffbbb"
| June 5 || Connecticut || Doug Kingsmore Stadium • Clemson, SC || L 6–7 || Vance (1–0) || Weismann (3–5) || None || 4,877 || 43–19 || 2–1
|- bgcolor="ffbbb"
| June 6 || Connecticut || Doug Kingsmore Stadium • Clemson, SC || L 1–14 || Nappo (10–2) || Pohle (5–2) || Feehan (1) || 4,838 || 43–20 || 2–2
|-

2012

Personnel

Roster

Coaches

Schedule

! style="" | Regular Season
|- valign="top" 

|- bgcolor="#ffbbb"
| 1 || February 17 ||  || Doug Kingsmore Stadium || 1–2 || Napoleon (1–0) || Campbell (0–1) || Nance (1) || 5,944 || 0–1 || –
|- bgcolor="#ccffcc"
| 2 || February 18 || UAB || Doug Kingsmore Stadium || 6–1 || Leone (1–0) || Bullard (0–1) ||  || DH || 1–1 || –
|- bgcolor="#ccffcc"
| 3 || February 18 || UAB || Doug Kingsmore Stadium || 7–4 || Pohle (1–0) || Munger (0–1) ||  || 5,608 || 2–1 || –
|- bgcolor="#ffbbb"
| 4 || February 24 ||  || Doug Kingsmore Stadium || 5–6 || Balentina (1–0) || Meyer (0–1) || Coughlin (1) || 3,793 || 2–2 || –
|- bgcolor="#ccffcc"
| 5 || February 25 || Maine || Doug Kingsmore Stadium || 9–5 || Leone (2–0) || Gibbs (0–1) ||  || 5,340 || 3–2 || –
|- bgcolor="#ccffcc"
| 6 || February 26 || Maine || Doug Kingsmore Stadium || 9–6 || Pohle (2–0) || Connolly (0–1) || Gossett (1) || 3,989 || 4–2 || –
|-

|- bgcolor="#ffbbb"
| 7 || March 2 || #2 South Carolina || Riley Park || 2–3 (11) || Koumas (1–0) || Gossett (0–1) || Belcher (1) || 5,851 || 4–3 || –
|- bgcolor="#ffbbb"
| 8 || March 3 || @ #2 South Carolina || Carolina Stadium || 6–9 || Beal (1–0) || Leone (2–1) || Belcher (2) || 8,242 || 4–4 || –
|- bgcolor="#ccffcc"
| 9 || March 4 || #2 South Carolina || Doug Kingsmore Stadium || 6–5 || Firth (1–0) || Koumas (1–1) ||  || 6,039 || 5–4 || –
|- bgcolor="#ccffcc"
| 10 || March 7 ||  || Doug Kingsmore Stadium || 16–4 || Haselden (1–0) || Walker (0–3) ||  || 3,564 || 6–4 || –
|- bgcolor="#ffbbb"
| 11 || March 9 || #6  || Doug Kingsmore Stadium || 3–4 || Emanuel (4–0) || Brady (0–1) || Morin (5) || 4,441 || 6–5 || 0–1
|- bgcolor="#ffbbb"
| 12 || March 10 || #6 North Carolina || Doug Kingsmore Stadium || 3–6 || Taylor (3–0) || Gossett (0–2) || Morin (6) || 5,513 || 6–6 || 0–2
|- bgcolor="#ffbbb"
| 13 || March 11 || #6 North Carolina || Doug Kingsmore Stadium || 5–6 (11) || Morin (1–0) || Campbell (0–2) ||  || 4,368 || 6–7 || 0–3
|- bgcolor="#ffbbb"
| 14 || March 14 || @ || Hennon Stadium || 4–8 || Nadale (2–0) || Haselden (1–1) ||  || 1,627 || 6–8 || 0–3
|- bgcolor="#ccffcc"
| 15 || March 16 ||  || Doug Kingsmore Stadium || 6–4 || Brady (1–1) || Stevens (2–1) || Campbell (1) || 4,021 || 7–8 || 1–3
|- bgcolor="#ccffcc"
| 16 || March 17 || Boston College || Doug Kingsmore Stadium || 6–3 || Leone (3–1) || Gordon (1–1) || Meyer (1) || 4,598 || 8–8 || 2–3
|- bgcolor="#ccffcc"
| 17 || March 18 || Boston College || Doug Kingsmore Stadium || 5–1 || Pohle (3–0) || Alvarez (1–3) ||  || 4,083 || 9–8 || 3–3
|- bgcolor="#ccffcc"
| 18 || March 20 ||  || Doug Kingsmore Stadium || 6–2 || Meyer (1–1) || McCoury (0–1) ||  || 3,760 || 10–8 || 3–3
|- bgcolor="#ccffcc"
| 19 || March 21 || Elon || Fluor Field at the West End || 4–2 || Gossett (1–2) || Whitehead (0–2) || Campbell (2) || 2,319 || 11–8 || 3–3
|- bgcolor="#ffbbb"
| 20 || March 23 || @Virginia || Davenport Field || 3–6 || Silverstein (2–2) || Brady (1–2) || Thompson (3) || 3,227 || 11–9 || 3–4
|- bgcolor="#ffbbb"
| 21 || March 24 || @Virginia || Davenport Field || 1–5 || Kline (4–2) || Leone (3–2) ||  || 3,033 || 11–10 || 3–5
|- bgcolor="#ffbbb"
| 22 || March 25 || @Virginia || Davenport Field || 3–5 || Lewicki (1–1) || Pohle (3–1) || Thompson (4) || 3,129 || 11–11 || 3–6
|- bgcolor="#ccffcc"
| 23 || March 27 || @#18  || Foley Field || 10–5 || Gossett (2–2) || Crumley (1–1) ||  || 2,691 || 12–11 || 3–6
|- bgcolor="#ffbbb"
| 24 || March 28 ||  || Doug Kingsmore Stadium || 4–8 || Grammer (1–1) || Meyer (1–2) || Ricchi (1) || 3,496 || 12–12 || 3–6
|- bgcolor="#ccffcc"
| 25 || March 30 || #8  || Doug Kingsmore Stadium || 3–1 || Campbell (1–2) || Erickson (4–3) || Firth (1) || 4,117  || 13–12 || 4–6
|- bgcolor="#ccffcc"
| 26 || March 31 || #8 Miami || Doug Kingsmore Stadium || 3–1 || Leone (4–2) || Whaley (3–2) || Andrews (1) || 4,758  || 14–12 || 5–6
|-

|- bgcolor="#ffbbb"
| 27 || April 1 || #8  || Doug Kingsmore Stadium || 2–4 || Salcines (3–0) || Kent (0–1) || Nedeljkovic (2) || 4,382 || 14–13 || 5–7
|- bgcolor="#ccffcc"
| 28 || April 3 ||  || Doug Kingsmore Stadium || 11–0 || Gossett (3–2) || Strong (0–2) ||  || 3,281 || 15–13 || 5–7
|- bgcolor="#ffbbb"
| 29 || April 4 ||  || Doug Kingsmore Stadium || 8–13 || Blackwell (1–0) || Andrews (0–1) ||  || 3,437 || 15–14 || 5–7
|- bgcolor="#ccffcc"
| 30 || April 6 || @ || Jack Coombs Field || 4–1 (11) || Firth (2–0) || Istler (2–2) ||  || 1,582 || 16–14 || 6–7
|- bgcolor="#ccffcc"
| 31 || April 7 || @Duke || Jack Coombs Field || 11–5 || Leone (5–2) || Swart-(3 4)|| Andrews (2) || 1,123 || 17–14 || 7–7
|- bgcolor="#ccffcc"
| 32 || April 8 || @Duke || Jack Coombs Field || 4–2 || Pohle (4–1) || Istler (2–3) || Gossett (2) || 1,038 || 18–14 || 8–7
|- bgcolor="#ccffcc"
| 33 || April 10 ||  || Doug Kingsmore Stadium || 12–5 || Haselden (2–1) || de Gruy (1–1) || Kent (1) || 5,610 || 19–14 || 8–7
|- bgcolor="#ffbbb"
| 34 || April 11 ||  || Doug Kingsmore Stadium || 7–8 || Ripple (1–0) || Andrews (0–2) || Dieterich (6) || 4,386 || 19–15 || 8–7
|- bgcolor="#ccffcc"
| 35 || April 13 ||  || Doug Kingsmore Stadium || 7–6 (12) || Firth (3–0) || Tzamtzis (3–3) ||  || 4,964 || 20–15 || 9–7
|- bgcolor="#ffbbb"
| 36 || April 14 || NC State || Doug Kingsmore Stadium || 1–3 || Rodon (6–0) || Leone (5–3) || Overman (3) || 5,619 || 20–16 || 9–8
|- bgcolor="#ffbbb"
| 37 || April 15 || NC State || Doug Kingsmore Stadium || 3–6 || Jernigan (4–1) || Pohle (4–2) || V. Williams (1) || 4,605 || 20–17 || 9–9
|- bgcolor="#ccffcc"
| 38 || April 17 ||  || Doug Kingsmore Stadium || 3–2 || Andrews (1–2) || Weekley (1–5) ||  || 3,323 || 21–17 || 9–9
|- bgcolor="#ccffcc"
| 39 || April 20 || @ || Shipley Field || 5–4 || Firth (4–0) || Haslup (3–4)  ||  || 878  || 22–17 || 10–9
|- bgcolor="#ccffcc"
| 40 || April 21 || @Maryland || Shipley Field || 5–3 ||Leone (6–3)  || Harman (5–3) ||  || DH || 23–17 || 11–9
|- bgcolor="#ccffcc"
| 41 || April 21 || @Maryland || Shipley Field || 7–2 ||Meyer (2–2)  || Carroll (3–2) ||  || 1,148  || 24–17 || 12–9
|- bgcolor="#ffbbb"
| 42 || April 24 ||  || Doug Kingsmore Stadium || 7–10 || Burke (5–3) || Andrews (1–3) || B. Smith (1) || 3,397  || 24–18 || 12–9
|- bgcolor="#ffbbb"
| 43 || April 27 || @ || Russ Chandler Stadium || 5–6 (13) || Didrick (1–0) || Meyer (2–3) ||  || 1,627  || 24–19 || 12–10
|- bgcolor="#ccffcc"
| 44 || April 28 || @Georgia Tech || Russ Chandler Stadium || 13–7 || Kent (1–1) || Isaacs (5–3) ||  || 1,947  || 25–19 || 13–10
|- bgcolor="#ccffcc"
| 45 || April 29 || @Georgia Tech || Russ Chandler Stadium || 11–8 || Gossett (4–2) || Pitts (4–4) ||  || 3,626  || 26–19 || 14–10
|-

|- bgcolor="#ccffcc"
| 46 || May 5 ||  || Doug Kingsmore Stadium || 4–3 (11) || Gossett (5–2) || Peterson (1–2) ||  || 5,030  || 27–19 || 14–10
|- bgcolor="#ccffcc"
| 47 || May 6 || College of Charleston || Doug Kingsmore Stadium || 12–3 || Pohle (5–2) || Renfro (6–5) ||  || 4,382  || 28–19 || 14–10
|- bgcolor="#ffbbb"
| 48 || May 7 || College of Charleston || Doug Kingsmore Stadium || 2–4 || Pegler (8–2) || Meyer (2–4) || Owings (2) || 3,343  || 28–20 || 14–10
|- bgcolor="#ccffcc"
| 49 || May 8 ||  || Doug Kingsmore Stadium || 9–8 (10) || Haselden (3–1) || McWhirter (0–4) ||  || 3,251  || 29–20 || 14–10
|- bgcolor="#ccffcc"
| 50 || May 12 || #1 Florida State || Doug Kingsmore Stadium || 7–2 || Gossett (6–2) || Leibrandt (6–2) ||  || 5,822  || 30–20 || 15–10
|- bgcolor="#ccffcc"
| 51 || May 14 || #1 Florida State || Doug Kingsmore Stadium || 9–7 || Pohle (6–2) || Compton (9–1) || Firth (2) || DH  || 31–20 || 16–10
|- bgcolor="#ffbbb"
| 52 || May 14 || #1 Florida State || Doug Kingsmore Stadium || 5–9 || Smith (2–0) || Meyer (2–5) ||  || 4,965  || 31–21 || 16–11
|- bgcolor="#ccffcc"
| 53 || May 15 ||  || Doug Kingsmore Stadium || 9–2 || Haselden (4–1) || Gary (3–1) ||  || 3,769  || 32–21 || 16–11
|- bgcolor="#ffbbb"
| 54 || May 17 || @ || Gene Hooks Field || 2–5 || Cooney (6–6) || Leone (6–4) || Dimock (12) || 648  || 32–22 || 16–12
|- bgcolor="#ffbbb"
| 55 || May 18 || @Wake Forest || Gene Hooks Field || 1–2 || Dimock (3–3) || Gossett (6–3) ||  || 1,241  || 32–23 || 16–13
|- bgcolor="#ffbbb"
| 56 || May 19 || @Wake Forest || Gene Hooks Field || 0–7 || Holmes (7–2) || Pohle (6–3) ||  || 1,461   || 32–24 || 16–14
|-

|-
! style="" | Post-Season
|- 

|- bgcolor="#ffbbb"
| 57 || May 24 ||  Virginia || NewBridge Bank Park || 2–3 || Crockett (5–2) || Kent (1–2) || Thompson (12) || 3,331   || 32–25 || 0–1
|- bgcolor="#ccffcc"
| 58 || May 25 ||  Florida State || NewBridge Bank Park || 9–7 || Andrews (2–3) || Benincasa (4–1) ||  || 3,282   || 33–25 || 1–1
|- bgcolor="#ffbbb"
| 59 || May 26 ||    || NewBridge Bank Park || 1–5 || Davies (1–3) || Pohle (6–4) || Cruz (2) || 3,272   || 33–26 || 1–2
|-

|- bgcolor="#ccffcc"
| 60 || June 1 ||  || Carolina Stadium || 11–3 || Pohle (7–4) || Wallace (5–1) || Haselden (1) || 6,791  || 34–26 || 1–0
|- bgcolor="#ffbbb"
| 61 || June 2 || South Carolina || Carolina Stadium || 4–5 (12) || Beal (4–4) || Brady (1–3) ||  || 8,242  || 34–27 || 1–1
|- bgcolor="#ccffcc"
| 62 || June 3 || Coastal Carolina || Carolina Stadium || 5–3 || Leone (7–4) || Smith (2–2) || Firth (3) || 6,111  || 35–27 || 2–1
|- bgcolor="#ffbbb"
| 63 || June 3 || South Carolina || Carolina Stadium || 3–4 || Montgomery (5–1) || Haselden (4–2) || Webb (3) || 8,242  || 35–28 || 2–2
|-

Rankings

2013

2014

Personnel

Roster

Coaches

Game log

! style="" | Regular Season 34–22 (15–14 ACC)
|- valign="top" 

|- bgcolor="#ffbbb"
| February 14 ||  || Doug Kingsmore Stadium • Clemson, SC || 5–6 (10) || Calibuso (1–0) || Schmidt (0–1) || Weber (1) || 5,143 || 0–1 ||
|- bgcolor="#ccffcc"
| February 15 || Eastern Michigan || Doug Kingsmore Stadium • Clemson, SC || 5–3 || Crownover (1–0) || Sharp (1–0) || Erwin (1) || 5,229 || 1–1 ||
|- bgcolor="#ccffcc"
| February 16 || Eastern Michigan || Doug Kingsmore Stadium • Clemson, SC || 9–7 || Campbell (1–0) || Land (0–1) || None || 5,064 || 2–1 ||
|- bgcolor="#ccffcc"
| February 21 ||  || Doug Kingsmore Stadium • Clemson, SC || 5–2 || Gossett (1–0) || Lawrence (0–2) || Erwin (2) || 4,790 || 3–1 ||
|- bgcolor="#ccffcc"
| February 22 || Maine || Doug Kingsmore Stadium • Clemson, SC || 13–3 || Crownover (2–0) || Fullmer (0–1) || None || 5,902 || 4–1 ||
|- bgcolor="#ccffcc"
| February 23 || Maine || Doug Kingsmore Stadium • Clemson, SC || 10–2 || Long (1–0) || Heath (1–1) || None || 4,389 || 5–1 ||
|- bgcolor="#ccffcc"
| February 25 ||  || Doug Kingsmore Stadium • Clemson, SC || 4–2 || Schmidt (1–1) || Kehner (0–2) || Campbell (1) || 3,759 || 6–1 ||
|- bgcolor="#ffbbb"
| February 28 || @ #5 South Carolina || Carolina Stadium • Columbia, SC || 6–9 || Mincey (1–0) || Bates (0–1) || Seddon (2) || 8,242 || 6–2 ||
|-

|- bgcolor="#ffbbb"
| March 1 || vs. #5 South Carolina || Fluor Field at the West End • Greenville, SC || 2–10 || Wynkoop (3–0) || Crownover (2–1) || None || 7,182 || 6–3 ||
|- bgcolor="#ffbbb"
| March 2 || #5 South Carolina || Doug Kingsmore Stadium • Clemson, SC || 5–3 || Mincey (2–0) || Schmidt (1–2) || None || 6,016 || 6–4 ||
|- bgcolor="#ffbbb"
| March 4 || @  || Hennon Stadium • Cullowhee, NC || 10–18 || Sammons (3–0) || Bostic (0–1) || None || 1,121 || 6–5 ||
|- bgcolor="#ccffcc"
| March 7 || Virginia Tech || Doug Kingsmore Stadium • Clemson, SC || 7–5 || Campbell (2–0) || Markey (2–2) || None || 3,715 || 7–6 || 1–0
|- bgcolor="#ccffcc"
| March 8 || Virginia Tech || Doug Kingsmore Stadium • Clemson, SC || 12–2 || Crownover (3–1) || Scheetz (1–1) || None || 5,481 || 8–5 || 2–0
|- bgcolor="#ccffcc"
| March 9 || Virginia Tech || Doug Kingsmore Stadium • Clemson, SC || 11–4 || Schmidt (2–2) || McIntyre (1–2) || None || 4,566 || 9–5 || 3–0
|- bgcolor="#ccffcc"
| March 12 ||  || Doug Kingsmore Stadium • Clemson, SC || 2–1 || Erwin (1–0) || Mason (0–1) || Campbell (2) || 3,450 || 10–5 ||
|- bgcolor="#ffbbb"
| March 14 || @  || Gene Hooks Field • Winston-Salem, NC || 3–4 || Fischer (2–1) || Schmidt (2–3) || Fossas (4) || 638 || 10–6 || 3–1
|- bgcolor="#ccffcc"
| March 15 (Game 1) || @ Wake Forest || Gene Hooks Field • Winston-Salem, NC || 16–6 || Crownover (4–1) || McLeod (2–1) || Moyer (1) ||  || 11–6 || 4–1
|- bgcolor="#ccffcc"
| March 15 (Game 2) || @ Wake Forest || Gene Hooks Field • Winston-Salem, NC || 7–4 || Long (2–0) || Kaden (1–2) || Campbell (3) || 1,056 || 12–6 || 5–1
|- bgcolor="#ffbbb"
| March 18 || @  || J. I. Clements Stadium • Statesboro, GA || 5–14 || Frederick (2–0) || Erwin (1–1) || None || 1,240 || 12–7 ||
|- bgcolor="#ccffcc"
| March 19 || @ Georgia Southern || J. I. Clements Stadium • Statesboro, GA || 5–4 || Moyer (1–0) || Alonzo (2–2) || Campbell (4) || 1,095 || 13–7 ||
|- bgcolor="#ccffcc"
| March 21 || #2 Florida State || Doug Kingsmore Stadium • Clemson, SC || 9–3 || Gossett (2–0) || Weaver (4–2) || None || 4,948 || 14–7 || 6–1
|- bgcolor="#ffbbb"
| March 22 (Game 1) || #2 Florida State || Doug Kingsmore Stadium • Clemson, SC || 1–11 || Leibrandt (4–1) || Crownover (4–2) || None || || 14–8 || 6–2
|- bgcolor="#ffbbb"
| March 22 (Game 2) || #2 Florida State || Doug Kingsmore Stadium • Clemson, SC || 3–4 || Smith (3–0) || Schmidt (2–4) || Winston (4) || 6,016 || 14–9 || 6–3
|- bgcolor="#ccffcc"
| March 25 || @  || Foley Field • Athens, GA || 16–4 || Schmidt (3–4) || Walsh (1–1) || None || 2,147 || 15–9 ||
|- bgcolor="#ccffcc"
| March 28 (Game 1) || @ #25 Maryland || Shipley Field • College Park, MD || 3–1 ||Gossett (3–0) || Casas (0–1) || Campbell (5) ||  || 16–9 || 7–3
|- bgcolor="#ccffcc"
| March 28 (Game 2) || @ #25 Maryland || Shipley Field • College Park, MD || 7–1 || Crownover (5–2) || Shawaryn (5–1) || None || 575 || 17–9 || 8–3
|- bgcolor="#bbb"
| March 30 || @ #25 Maryland* || Shipley Field • College Park, MD ||colspan=7|Cancelled – Rained Out
|-

|- bgcolor="#ccffcc"
| April 1 ||  || Doug Kingsmore Stadium • Clemson, SC || 13–2 || Erwin (2–1) || Greenfield (1–3) || None || 3,554 || 18–9 ||
|- bgcolor="#ccffcc"
| April 2 ||  || Doug Kingsmore Stadium • Clemson, SC || 4–2 || Schmidt (4–4)  || Sightler (2–2) || Campbell (6) || 3,683 || 19–9 ||
|- bgcolor="#ccffcc"
| April 5 ||  || Doug Kingsmore Stadium • Clemson, SC || 6–1  || Crownover (6–2) || Rodon (2–5) || None || 5,207 || 20–9 || 9–3
|- bgcolor="#ffbbb"
| April 6 || NC State || Doug Kingsmore Stadium • Clemson, SC || 4–9 || Thomas (2–0) || Erwin (2–2) || E. Peterson (2) || 4,199 || 20–10 || 9–4
|- bgcolor="#ffbbb"
| April 7 || NC State || Doug Kingsmore Stadium • Clemson, SC || 1–7 || O'Donnel (1–0) || Schmidt (4–5) || P. Peterson (1) || 3,217 || 20–11 || 9–5
|- bgcolor="#ffbbb"
| April 8 ||  || Doug Kingsmore Stadium • Clemson, SC || 2–6 || Boling (3–2) || Koerner (0–1) || None || 4,260 || 20–12 ||
|- bgcolor="#ffbbb"
| April 11 || @ #2 Virginia || Davenport Field • Charlottesville, VA || 2–3 || Kirby (7–1) || Crownover (6–3) || Howard (10) || 4,221 || 20–13 || 9–6
|- bgcolor="#ccffcc"
| April 12 || @ #2 Virginia || Davenport Field • Charlottesville, VA || 7–1 || Gossett (4–0)|| Sborz (3–2) || None || 4,886 || 21–13 || 10–6
|- bgcolor="#ffbbb"
| April 13 || @ #2 Virginia || Davenport Field • Charlottesville, VA || 0–1 || Waddell (5–1) || Long (2–1) || Howard (11) || 4,840 || 21–14 || 10–7
|- bgcolor="#ccffcc"
| April 15 ||  || Doug Kingsmore Stadium • Clemson, SC || 9–6 || Moyer (2–0) || Hunter (0–1) || Bates (1) || 3,806 || 22–14 ||
|- bgcolor="#ccffcc"
| April 18 || @  || Cost Field • Pittsburgh, PA || 3–2 (11) || Moyer (3–0) || Harris (3–5) || None || 609 || 23–14 || 11–7
|- bgcolor="#ccffcc"
| April 19 || @ Pittsburgh || Cost Field • Pittsburgh, PA || 3–0 || Gossett (5–0) || Zeuch (1–3) || None || 986 || 24–14 || 12–7
|- bgcolor="#ffbbb"
| April 20 || @ Pittsburgh || Cost Field • Pittsburgh, PA || 4–13 || Wotherspoon (4–5) || Long (2–2) || None || 428 || 24–15 || 12–8
|- bgcolor="#ffbbb"
| April 22 || ** || Doug Kingsmore Stadium • Clemson, SC || 3–4 || Clowers (5–0) || Schmidt (4–6) || Perritt (9) || 3,015 || 24–16 ||
|- bgcolor="#ccffcc"
| April 23 ||  || Doug Kingsmore Stadium • Clemson, SC || 11–3 || Erwin (3–2) || Danielson (0–1) || None || 3,892 || 25–16 ||
|- bgcolor="#ffbbb"
| April 25 ||  || Doug Kingsmore Stadium • Clemson, SC || 2–5 || Ch. Diaz (7–0) || Crownover (6–4) || B. Garcia (12) || 4,856 || 25–17 || 12–9
|- bgcolor="#ffbbb"
| April 26 || Miami (FL) || Doug Kingsmore Stadium • Clemson, SC || 2–3 (12) || Woodrey (3–0) || Moyer (3–1) || B. Garcia (13) || 5,588 || 25–18 || 12–10
|- bgcolor="#ffbbb"
| April 27 || Miami (FL) || Doug Kingsmore Stadium • Clemson, SC || 2–10 || Radziewski (4–2) || Long (2–3) || None || 4,300 || 25–19 || 12–11
|-

|- bgcolor="#ccffcc"
| May 2 ||  || Doug Kingsmore Stadium • Clemson, SC || 8–0 || Erwin (4–2) || Huffman (4–6) || None || 3,715 || 26–19 ||
|- bgcolor="#ccffcc"
| May 3 || James Madison || Doug Kingsmore Stadium • Clemson, SC || 9–4 || Campbell (3–0) || Cundiff (1–2) || None || 3,949 || 27–19 ||
|- bgcolor="#ccffcc"
| May 4 ||  || Fluor Field at the West End • Greenville, SC || 6–2 || Gossett (6–0) || Bonnell (5–4) || None || 2,417 || 28–19 ||
|- bgcolor="#ccffcc"
| May 5 || UNLV || Doug Kingsmore Stadium • Clemson, SC || 5–2 || Long (3–3) || Oakley (3–5) || Moyer (2) || 3,581 || 29–19 ||
|- bgcolor="#ccffcc"
| May 7 ||  || Doug Kingsmore Stadium • Clemson, SC || 1–0 || Schmidt (5–6) || Carlson (1–1) || Campbell (7) || 3,502 || 30–19 ||
|- bgcolor="#ffbbb"
| May 9 || @  || Frank Eck Stadium • Notre Dame, IN || 1–2 || Connaughton (2–5) || Crownover (6–5) || Hissa (3) || 716 || 30–20 || 12–12
|- bgcolor="#ccffcc"
| May 10 || @ Notre Dame || Frank Eck Stadium • Notre Dame, IN || 8–0 || Gossett (7–0) || M. Hearne (4–6) || None || 678 || 31–20 || 13–12
|- bgcolor="#ffbbb"
| May 11 || @ Notre Dame || Frank Eck Stadium • Notre Dame, IN || 3–11 || Kerrigan (3–1) || Erwin (4–3) || None || 702 || 31–21 || 13–13
|- bgcolor="#ccffcc"
| May 13 || Furman || Flour Field at the West End • Greenville, SC || 7–2 || Moyer (4–1) || Dittmar (0–3) || None || 2,459 || 32–21 ||
|- bgcolor="#ccffcc"
| May 15 ||  || Doug Kingsmore Stadium • Clemson, SC || 8–4 || Crownover (7–5) || Gorman (3–7) || None || 3,664 || 33–21 || 14–13
|- bgcolor="#ffbbb"
| May 16 || Boston College || Doug Kingsmore Stadium • Clemson, SC || 1–3 || Chin (5–2) || Gossett (7–1) || None || 4,083 || 33–22 || 14–14
|- bgcolor="#ccffcc"
| May 17 || Boston College || Doug Kingsmore Stadium • Clemson, SC || 10–9 (13) || Campbell (4–0) || Gorman (3–8) || None || 3,961 || 34–22 || 15–14
|-

|-
! style="" | Post-Season (2–3)
|- 

|- bgcolor="#ccffcc"
| May 21 ||  || NewBridge Bank Park • Greensboro, NC || 5–3 || Crownover (8–5) || Matuella (1–3) || Campbell (8) || 3,492 || 35–22 || 1–0
|- bgcolor="#ccffcc"
| May 22 ||  || NewBridge Bank Park • Greensboro, NC || 3–2 || Moyer (5–1) || Bryan Garcia (5–1) || None || 3,417 || 36–22 || 2–0
|- bgcolor="#ffbbb"
| May 23 ||  || NewBridge Bank Park • Greensboro, NC || 0–3 || Isaacs (7–5) || Schmidt (5–7) || Clay (8) || 2,859 || 36–23 || 2–1
|-

|- bgcolor="#ffbbb"
| May 30 ||  || Hawkins Field • Nashville, TN || 1–18 || Thorpe (11–4) || Crownover (8–6) || None || 1,920 || 36–24 || 0–1
|- bgcolor="#ffbbb"
| May 31 ||  ||Hawkins Field • Nashville, TN  || 4–6 || Klever (7–6) || Gossett (7–2) || Campbell (1) || 1,891 || 36–25 || 0–2
|-

Ranking movements

Awards

ACC Conference Awards
All-ACC Selections:

•Daniel Gossett – SP (First Team)

•Steve Wilkerson – 2B (Second Team)

•Tyler Krieger – SS (Second Team)

•Garrett Boulware – C/DH (Second Team)

•Steven Duggar – OF (Third Team)

•Jay Baum – OF (Third Team)

•Matthew Crownover – SP (Third Team)

Golden Spikes Award
Semifinalist:
•Daniel Gossett – SP

2014 MLB Draft Class
The Clemson Tigers had 6 overall picks in the Draft, tied for 15th most in the country.

2015

Roster

Coaches

Schedule

! style="" | Regular Season
|- valign="top" 

|- bgcolor="ffbbb"
| February 13 || West Virginia || #28 || Doug Kingsmore Stadium • Clemson, SC || L 0–2 || Smith (1–0) || Crownover (0–1) || Bostic (1) || 4,890 || 0–1 ||
|- bgcolor="ccffcc"
| February 14 || West Virginia || #28 || Doug Kingsmore Stadium • Clemson, SC || W 4–2 || Erwin (1–0) || Vance (0–1) || Moyer (1) || 5,215 || 1–1 ||
|- bgcolor="ffbbb"
| February 15 || West Virginia || #28 || Doug Kingsmore Stadium • Clemson, SC || L 1–6 || Donato (1–0) || Koerner (0–1) || None || 3,694 || 1–2 ||
|- bgcolor="ccffcc"
| February 20 ||  ||  || Lake Olmstead Stadium • Augusta, GA || W 10–1 || Crownover (1–1) || Marks (0–1) || None || 307 || 2–2 || 
|- bgcolor="ccffcc"
| February 21 || Maine ||  || Lake Olmstead Stadium • Augusta, GA || W 5–414 || Schnell (1–0) || Butler (0–1) || None ||  || 3–2 ||
|- bgcolor="ccffcc"
| February 22 || Maine ||  || Lake Olmstead Stadium • Augusta, GA || W 10–2 || Koerner (1–) || Courtney (0–2) || None || 1,461 || 4–2 ||
|- bgcolor="ccffcc"
| February 25 ||  ||  || Doug Kingsmore Stadium • Clemson, SC || W 11–5 || Barnes (1–0) || Anderson (1–1) || None || 3,280 || 5–2 ||
|- bgcolor="ccffcc"
| February 27 || #15 South Carolina ||  || Doug Kingsmore Stadium • Clemson, SC || W 11–4 || Crownover (2–0) || Crowe (1–1) || Schnell (1) || 6,272 || 6–2 ||
|- bgcolor="ffbbb"
| February 28 || vs. #15 South Carolina ||  || Fluor Field at the West End • Greenville, SC || L 1–4 || Wynkoop (2–1) || Erwin (1–1) || Widener (3) || 7,175 || 6–3 ||
|-
| colspan=11 | 
|-

|- bgcolor="ccffcc"
| March 2 || at #17 South Carolina ||  || Carolina Stadium • Columbia, SC || W 7–0 || Koerner (2–1) || Reagan (0–1) || None || 8,242 || 7–3 ||
|- bgcolor="ffbbb"
| March 3 ||  ||  || Doug Kingsmore Stadium • Clemson, SC || L 4–5 || Strong (2–0) || Barnes (1–1) || Strain (3) || 3,209 || 7–4 ||
|- bgcolor="ccffcc"
| March 6 || at NC State ||  || Doak Field • Raleigh, NC || W 6–4 || Crownover (3–0) || Wilder (1–3) || Moyer (2) || 496 || 8–4 || 1–0
|- bgcolor="ffbbb"
| March 7 || at NC State ||  || Doak Field • Raleigh, NC || L 3–8 || Britt (2–0) || Erwin (1–2) || None || 1,508 || 8–5 || 1–1
|- bgcolor="ffbbb"
| March 8 || at NC State ||  || Doak Field • Raleigh, NC || L 6–14 || Piedmonte (1–0) || Koerner (2–2) || None || 1,745 || 8–6 || 1–2
|- bgcolor="ffbbb"
| March 11 || vs.  ||  || Fluor Field at the West End • Greenville, SC || L 6–8 || Mockbee (1–0) || Barnes (1–2) || None || 1,685 || 8–7 ||
|- bgcolor="ccffcc"
| March 14 || Notre Dame ||  || Doug Kingsmore Stadium • Clemson, SC || W 6–1 || Crownover (4–0) || Kerrigan (1–2) || None ||  || 9–7 || 2–2
|- bgcolor="ffbbb"
| March 14 || Notre Dame ||  || Doug Kingsmore Stadium • Clemson, SC || L 6–11 || Guenther (1–0) || Krall (0–1) || Solomon (4) || 4,961 || 9–8 || 2–3
|- bgcolor="ffbbb"
| March 15 || Notre Dame ||  || Doug Kingsmore Stadium • Clemson, SC || L 1–5 || McCarty (3–1) || Erwin (1–3) || None || 4,343 || 9–9 || 2–4
|- bgcolor="ffbbb"
| March 17 || at  ||  || Springs Brooks Stadium • Conway, SC || L 5–9 || Sawczak (1–1) || Campbell (0–1) || Holmes (1) || 2,825 || 9–10 ||
|- bgcolor="ccffcc"
| March 20 || at Virginia Tech ||  || English Field • Blacksburg, VA || W 4–010 || Moyer (1–0) || Scherzer (1–1) || None || 403 || 10–10 || 3–4
|- bgcolor="ccffcc"
| March 21 || at Virginia Tech ||  || English Field • Blacksburg, VA || W 15–8 || Koerner (3–2) || McGarity (2–2) || None || 1,549 || 11–10 || 4–4
|- bgcolor="ffbbb"
| March 22 || at Virginia Tech ||  || English Field • Blacksburg, VA || L 3–412 || Monaco (1–0) || Schmidt (0–1) || None || 1–484 || 11–11 || 4–5
|- bgcolor="ccffcc"
| March 24 || at  ||  || Hennon Stadium • Cullowhee, NC || W 19–2 || Schnell (2–0) || Sikes (1–1) || None || 1,053 || 12–11 ||
|- bgcolor="ffbbb"
| March 27 || Wake Forest ||  || Doug Kingsmore Stadium • Clemson, SC || L 2–8 || Pirro (6–1) || Crownover (4–1) || None || 3,750 || 12–12 || 4–6
|- bgcolor="ffbbb"
| March 28 || Wake Forest ||  || Doug Kingsmore Stadium • Clemson, SC || L 3–7 || Craig (1–1) || Koerner (3–3) || Dunshee (2) || 4,386 || 12–13 || 4–7
|- bgcolor="ccffcc"
| March 29 || Wake Forest || ||  Doug Kingsmore Stadium • Clemson, SC || W 6–2 || Erwin (2–3) || Johnstone (1–2) || None || 4,098 || 13–13 || 5–7
|- bgcolor="ccffcc"
| March 31 ||  ||  || Doug Kingsmore Stadium • Clemson, SC || W 5–4 || Vetzel (1–0) || Warford (3–1) || None || 3,735 || 14–13 || 
|-

|- bgcolor="ffbbb"
| April 1 ||  ||  || Doug Kingsmore Stadium • Clemson, SC || L 4–5 || Deal (2–0) || Campbell (0–2) || Kehner (3) || 3,966 || 14–14 ||
|- bgcolor="ccffcc"
| April 3 ||  ||  || Doug Kingsmore Stadium • Clemson, SC || W 5–2 || Crownover (5–1) || Gallen (1–2) || Vetzel (1) || 4,802 || 15–14 || 6–7
|- bgcolor="ccffcc"
| April 4 || North Carolina ||  || Doug Kingsmore Stadium • Clemson, SC || W 5–411 || Krall (1–1) || Thornton (1–3) || None || 5,067 || 16–14 || 7–7
|- bgcolor="ffbbb"
| April 5 || North Carolina ||  || Doug Kingsmore Stadium • Clemson, SC || L 7–8 || Moss (5–0) || Koerner (3–4) || Thornton (5) || 4,239 || 16–15 || 7–8
|- bgcolor="ffbbb"
| April 7 ||  ||  || Doug Kingsmore Stadium • Clemson, SC || L 2–3 || Tucker (1–1) || Vetzel (1–1) || Cheek (5) || 4,598 || 16–16 ||
|- bgcolor="ffbbb"
| April 8 ||  ||  || Doug Kingsmore Stadium • Clemson, SC || L 3–410 || Hubbard (3–0) || Bostic (0–2) || None || 3,312 || 16–17 || 
|- bgcolor="ccffcc"
| April 10 || at Boston College ||  || Eddie Pellagrini Diamond at John Shea Field • Chestnut Hill, MA || W 15–6 || Crownover (6–1) || King (0–2) || Campbell (1) || 337 || 17–17 || 8–8
|- bgcolor="ffbbb"
| April 11 || at Boston College ||  || Eddie Pellagrini Diamond at John Shea Field • Chestnut Hill, MA || L 7–8 || Dunn (4–2) || Vetzel (1–2) || Adams (1) || 1,203 || 17–18 || 8–9
|- bgcolor="ccffcc"
| April 12 || at Boston College ||  || Eddie Pellagrini Diamond at John Shea Field • Chestnut Hill, MA || W 6–3 || Koerner (4–4) || Murphy (0–2) || Krall (1) || 654 || 18–18 || 9–9
|- bgcolor="ccffcc"
| April 14 ||  ||  || Doug Kingsmore Stadium • Clemson, SC || W 14–2 || Long (1–0) || Nail (2–3) || None || 3,637 || 19–18 ||
|- bgcolor="ccffcc"
| April 15 ||  ||  || Doug Kingsmore Stadium • Clemson, SC || W 7–5 || Schmidt (1–1) || Walker (1–3) || Krall (2) || 3,197 || 20–18 ||
|- bgcolor="ccffcc"
| April 18 || Duke ||  || Doug Kingsmore Stadium • Clemson, SC || W 6–2 || Crownover (7–1) || Haviland (1–1) || None ||  || 21–18 || 10–9
|- bgcolor="ccffcc"
| April 18 || Duke ||  || Doug Kingsmore Stadium • Clemson, SC || W 8–1 || Erwin (3–3) || Istler (3–3) || None || 5,531 || 22–18 || 11–9
|- bgcolor="ffbbb"
| April 21 || at Georgia ||  || Foley Field • Athens, GA || L 0–7 || Walsh (4–1) || Koerner (4–5) || None || 2,490 || 22–19 ||
|- bgcolor="ffbbb"
| April 24 || at Georgia Tech ||  || Russ Chandler Stadium • Atlanta, GA || L 2–4 || Ryan (6–1) || Vetzel (1–3) || None || 1,825 || 22–20 || 11–10
|- bgcolor="ccffcc"
| April 25 || at Georgia Tech ||  || Russ Chandler Stadium • Atlanta, GA || W 11–3 || Erwin (7–3) || Pitts (0–5) || None || 1,257 || 23–20 || 12–10
|- bgcolor="ffbbb"
| April 26 || at Georgia Tech ||  || Russ Chandler Stadium • Atlanta, GA || L 4–510 || Ryan (7–1) || Schmidt (1–2) || None || 1,791 || 23–21 || 12–11
|-

|- bgcolor="ccffcc"
| May 2 || #3 Louisville ||  || Doug Kingsmore Stadium • Clemson, SC || W 9–1 || Crownover (8–1) || Funkhouser (6–3) || None || 4,394 || 24–21 || 13–11
|- bgcolor="ffbbb"
| May 3 || #3 Louisville ||  || Doug Kingsmore Stadium • Clemson, SC || L 3–5 || Leland (4–0) || Erwin (4–4) || Burdi (6) || 4,447 || 24–22 || 13–12
|- bgcolor="ffbbb"
| May 4 || #3 Louisville ||  || Doug Kingsmore Stadium • Clemson, SC || L 5–9 || Henzman (4–1) || Schmidt (1–3) || None || 3,968 || 24–23 || 13–13
|- bgcolor="ffbbb"
| May 5 || at  ||  || Russell C. King Field • Spartanburg, SC || L 9–17 || Leftwich (6–2) || Krall (1–2) || Stillman (14) || 1,187 || 24–24 || 
|- bgcolor="ccffcc"
| May 6 || #20  ||  || Doug Kingsmore Stadium • Clemson, SC || W 6–3 || Schmidt (2–3) || Bauer (3–3) || Vetzel (2) || 3,712 || 25–24 || 
|- bgcolor="ccffcc"
| May 8 ||  ||  || Doug Kingsmore Stadium • Clemson, SC || W 13–5 || Crownover (9–1) || Challenger (5–2) || None || 3,765 || 26–24 ||
|- bgcolor="ccffcc"
| May 9 || Georgia Southern ||  || Doug Kingsmore Stadium • Clemson, SC || W 5–4 || Erwin (5–4) || Frederick (2–1) || Vetzel (3) || 4,866 || 27–24 ||
|- bgcolor="ffbbb"
| May 10 || Georgia Southern ||  || Doug Kingsmore Stadium • Clemson, SC || L 4–7 || Richman (7–1) || Krall (1–3) || Paesano (3) || 3,689 || 27–25 ||
|- bgcolor="ccffcc"
| May 12 || at  ||  || Fluor Field at the West End • Greenville, SC || W 23–15 || Krall (2–3) || Warford (4–3) || None ||  || 28–25 ||
|- bgcolor="ccffcc"
| May 14 || at #8 Florida State ||  || Mike Martin Field at Dick Howser Stadium • Tallahassee, FL || W 4–1 || Crownover (10–1) || Biegalski (5–4) || Krall (3) ||  || 29–25 || 14–13
|- bgcolor="ccffcc"
| May 15 || at #8 Florida State ||  || Mike Martin Field at Dick Howser Stadium • Tallahassee, FL || W 7–0 || Erwin (6–4) || Compton (3–3) || Vetzel (4) ||  || 30–25 || 15–13
|- bgcolor="ccffcc"
| May 16 || at #8 Florida State ||  || Mike Martin Field at Dick Howser Stadium • Tallahassee, FL || W 9–6 || Long (2–0) || Carlton (3–5) || None ||  || 31–25 || 16–13
|-

|-
! style="" | Post-Season
|- 

|- bgcolor="ffbbb"
| May 20 || #10 Florida State || #28 || Durham Bulls Athletic Park • Durham, NC || L 1–3 || Biegalski (6–4) || Crownover (10–2) || Strode (13) || 3,155 || 31–26 || 0–1
|- bgcolor="ccffcc"
| May 21 || #5 Louisville || #28 || Durham Bulls Athletic Park • Durham, NC || W 7–2 || Erwin (7–4) || Funkhouser (7–5) || None || 2,858 || 32–26 || 1–1
|- bgcolor="ffbbb"
| May 22 || North Carolina || #28 || Durham Bulls Athletic Park • Durham, NC || L 3–6 || Bukausas (5–3) || Long (2–1) || Kelley (5) || 3,630 || 32–27 || 1–2
|-

|- bgcolor="ffbbb"
| May 29 || vs. #18  || #28 || Goodwin Field • Fullerton, CA || L 4–7 || Kellogg (9–2) || Crownover (10–3) || Burr (14) || 1,478 || 32–28 || 0–1
|- bgcolor="ffbbb"
| May 30 || vs.  || #28 || Goodwin Field • Fullerton, CA || L 8–10 || Gamboa (6–2) || Krall (2–4) || None ||  || 32–29 || 0–2
|-

Rankings

2016

Personnel

Roster

Coaches

Schedule

! style="" | Regular Season
|- valign="top" 

|-bgcolor=ffbbb
| Feb 19 || * ||  || Doug Kingsmore Stadium • Clemson, SC || L 3–4 || Johnson (1–0) || Eubanks (0–1) || Fullmer (1) || 5,497 || 0–1 || 
|-bgcolor=ccffcc
| Feb 20 || Maine* ||  || Doug Kingsmore Stadium • Clemson, SC || W 9–4 || Schmidt (1–0) || Murphy (0–1) || None || 4,618 || 1–1 || 
|-bgcolor=ccffcc
| Feb 21 || Maine* ||  || Doug Kingsmore Stadium • Clemson, SC || W 19–2 || Higginbotham (1–0) || Gelinas (0–1) || None || 4,570 || 2–1 || 
|-bgcolor=ccffcc
| Feb 26 || * ||  || Doug Kingsmore Stadium • Clemson, SC || W 6–1 || Barnes (1–0) || Hoover (1–1) || Eubanks (1) || 4,019 || 3–1 || 
|-bgcolor=ccffcc
| Feb 27 || James Madison* ||  || Doug Kingsmore Stadium • Clemson, SC || W 10–1 || Schmidt (2–0) || Harlow (0–1) || None || 5,158 || 4–1 || 
|-bgcolor=ccffcc
| Feb 28 || James Madison* ||  || Doug Kingsmore Stadium • Clemson, SC || W 11–2 || Crawford (1–0) || Withers (0–1) || None || 4,836 || 5–1 || 
|-

|-bgcolor=ccffcc
| Mar 1 || * ||  || Doug Kingsmore Stadium • Clemson, SC || W 7–0 || Eubanks (1–1) || Caskey (1–1) || None || 3,552 || 6–1 || 
|-bgcolor=ffbbb
| Mar 4 || at #18 South Carolina* ||  || Carolina Stadium • Columbia, SC || L 1–8 || Schmidt (3–0) || Barnes (1–1) || None || 8,242 || 6–2 || 
|-bgcolor=ccffcc
| Mar 5 || vs #18 South Carolina* ||  || Fluor Field at the West End • Greenville, SC || W 5–0 || Schmidt (3–0) || Webb (2–1) || Krall (1) || 7,216 || 7–2 || 
|-bgcolor=ccffcc
| Mar 6 || #18 South Carolina* ||  || Doug Kingsmore Stadium • Clemson, SC || W 4–1 || Eubanks (2–1) || Widener (0–1) || Bostic (1) || 6,524 ‡ || 8–2 || 
|-bgcolor=ccffcc
| Mar 9 || * || #20 || Doug Kingsmore Stadium • Clemson, SC || W 4–3 || Bostic (1–0) || Cook (0–1) || None || 3,867 || 9–2 || 
|-bgcolor=ffbbb
| Mar 11 || at  || #20 || Gene Hooks Field at Wake Forest Baseball Park • Winston-Salem, NC || L 4–6 || Dunshee (3–1) || Barnes (1–2) || Craig (3) || 1,017 || 9–3 || 0–1
|-bgcolor=ccffcc
| Mar 12 || at Wake Forest || #20 || Gene Hooks Field at Wake Forest Baseball Park • Winston-Salem, NC || W 6–5 || Krall (1–0) || Johnstone (1–2) || Bostic (2) || 1,134 || 10–3 || 1–1
|-bgcolor=ccffcc
| Mar 13 || at Wake Forest || #20 || Gene Hooks Field at Wake Forest Baseball Park • Winston-Salem, NC || W 13–8 || Crawford (2–0) || Roberts (0–1) || None || 646 || 11–3 || 2–1
|-bgcolor=ccffcc
| Mar 15 || at The Citadel* || #19 || Joseph P. Riley Jr. Park • Charleston, SC || W 12–1 || Higginbotham (2–0) || Bialakis (0–1) || None || 5,524 || 12–3 || 
|-bgcolor=ccffcc
| Mar 16 || at The Citadel* || #19 || Joseph P. Riley Jr. Park • Charleston, SC || W 5–4 || Bostic (2–0) || Smith (1–1) || None || 4,689 || 13–3 || 
|-bgcolor=ccffcc
| Mar 18 || #22  || #19 || Doug Kingsmore Stadium • Clemson, SC || W 6–2 || Schmidt (4–0) || King (3–1) || None || 4,993 || 14–3 || 3–1
|-bgcolor=ccffcc
| Mar 19 || #22 Boston College || #19 || Doug Kingsmore Stadium • Clemson, SC || W 6–1 || Barnes (2–2) || Je. Adams (2–2) || Crawford (1) || 4,518 || 15–3 || 4–1
|-bgcolor=ccffcc
| Mar 20 || #22 Boston College || #19 || Doug Kingsmore Stadium • Clemson, SC || W 3–210 || Bostic (3–0) || Nicklas (3–1) || None || 3,675 || 16–3 || 5–1
|-bgcolor=ccffcc
| Mar 22 || * || #12 || Doug Kingsmore Stadium • Clemson, SC || W 8–4 || Higginbotham (3–0) || Sauer (2–2) || None || 3,871 || 17–3 || 
|-bgcolor=ffbbb
| Mar 25 || at #5 Miami (FL) || #12 || Alex Rodriguez Park at Mark Light Field • Coral Gables, FL || L 8–9 || B. Garcia (2–0) || Bostic (3–1) || None || 2,811 || 17–4 || 5–2
|-bgcolor=ffbbb
| Mar 26 || at #5 Miami (FL) || #12 || Mark Light Field at Alex Rodriguez Park • Coral Gables, FL || L 4–5 11 || Bartow (2–0) || Bostic (3–2) || None || 3,246 || 17–5 || 5–3
|-bgcolor=ffbbb
| Mar 27 || at #5 Miami (FL) || #12 || Mark Light Field at Alex Rodriguez Park • Coral Gables, FL || L 5–10 || D. Garcia (4–2) || Eubanks (2–2) || None || 2,480 || 17–6 || 5–4
|-bgcolor=ccffcc
| Mar 29 || at * || #17 || Fluor Field at the West End • Greenville, SC || W 9–7 || Krall (2–0) || Mullen (0–2) || None || 4,013 || 18–6 || 
|-bgcolor=ccffcc
| Mar 30 || at * || #17 || Hennon Stadium • Cullowhee, NC || W 10–8 || Gilliam (1–0) || Davis (3–1) || None || 1,409 ||  19–6|| 
|-

|-bgcolor=ccffcc
| Apr 1 ||  || #17 || Doug Kingsmore Stadium • Clemson, SC || W 14–6 || Schmidt (5–0) || Falk (2–3) || None || 4,416 || 20–6 || 6–4
|-bgcolor=ffbbb
| Apr 2 || Pittsburgh || #17 || Doug Kingsmore Stadium • Clemson, SC || L 5–15 || Zeuch (2–0) || Barnes (2–3) || Chentouf (2) || 6,165 || 20–7 || 6–5
|-bgcolor=ccffcc
| Apr 3 || Pittsburgh || #17 || Doug Kingsmore Stadium • Clemson, SC || W 4–3 || Krall (3–0) || Falk (2–4) || None || 5,597 || 21–7 || 7–5
|-bgcolor=ccffcc
| Apr 5 || at * || #17 || Foley Field • Athens, GA || W 11–6 || Krall (4–0) || Moody (0–3) || None || 4,128 || 22–7 || 
|-bgcolor=ffbbb
| Apr 8 || at  || #17 || Jack Coombs Field • Durham, NC || L 3–5 || Clark (3–3) || Schmidt (5–1) || Stallings (3) || 517 || 22–8 || 7–6
|-bgcolor=ccffcc
| Apr 9 || at Duke || #17 || Jack Coombs Field • Durham, NC || W 3–2 || Barnes (3–3) || Stallings (1–2) || Krall (2) || 603 || 23–8 || 8–6
|-bgcolor=ffbbb
| Apr 10 || at Duke || #17 || Jack Coombs Field • Durham, NC || L 2–1 || McAfee (5–2) || Eubanks (2–3) || None || 717 || 23–9 || 8–7
|-bgcolor=ccffcc
| Apr 12 || Western Carolina* || #23 || Doug Kingsmore Stadium • Clemson, SC || W 7–610 || Krall (5–0) || Sikes (0–1) || None || 3,440 || 24–9 || 
|-bgcolor=ffbbb
| Apr 15 || at #6  || #23 || Jim Patterson Stadium • Louisville, KY || L 2–15 || McKay (7–1) || Schmidt (5–2) || None || 2,738 || 24–10 || 8–8
|-bgcolor=ffbbb
| Apr 16 || at #6 Louisville || #23 || Jim Patterson Stadium • Louisville, KY || L 2–7 || Harrington (8–1) || Barnes (3–4) || None || 4,950 || 24–11 || 8–9
|-bgcolor=ffbbb
| Apr 17 || at #6 Louisville || #23 || Jim Patterson Stadium • Louisville, KY || L  8–9 || Hummel (2–0) || Krall (5–1) || None || 2,818 || 24–12 || 8–10
|-bgcolor=ccffcc
| Apr 19 || Georgia || #23 || Doug Kingsmore Stadium • Clemson, SC || W 12–0 || Gilliam (2–0) || Gist (3–2) || None || 4,736 || 25–12 || 
|-bgcolor=ccffcc
| Apr 22 ||  || #23 || Doug Kingsmore Stadium • Clemson, SC || W 8–7 || Krall (6–1) || Gorst (0–1) || None || 4,062 || 26–12 || 9–10
|-bgcolor=ffbbb
| Apr 23 || Georgia Tech || #23 || Doug Kingsmore Stadium • Clemson, SC || L 1–16 || Parr (7–0) || Eubanks (2–4) || None || 6,235 || 26–13 || 9–11
|-bgcolor=ffbbb
| Apr 24 || Georgia Tech || #23 || Doug Kingsmore Stadium • Clemson, SC || L 5–7 || Dulaney (2–3) || Gilliam (2–1) || Gorst (10) || 4,818 || 26–14 || 9–12
|-bgcolor=ccffcc
| Apr 30 || #3 Florida State ||  || Doug Kingsmore Stadium • Clemson, SC ||  W 10–3 || Eubanks (3–4) || Compton (5–3) || None || 5,304 || 27–14 || 10–12
|-

|-bgcolor=ffbbb
| May 1 || #3 Florida State ||  || Doug Kingsmore Stadium • Clemson, SC ||  L 2–11 || Carlton (5–2) || Schmidt (5–3) ||  None || 4,196 || 27–15 || 10–13
|-bgcolor=ccffcc
| May 2 || #3 Florida State ||  || Doug Kingsmore Stadium • Clemson, SC || W 7–3 || Krall (7–1) || Holton (2–3)|| None || 3,331 || 28–15 || 11–13 
|-bgcolor=ccffcc
| May 4 || Furman* ||  || Doug Kingsmore Stadium • Clemson, SC || W 7–611|| Eubanks (4–4) || Crawford (0–4) || None || 4,549 || 29–15 || 
|-bgcolor=ccffcc
| May 6 || #9  ||  || Doug Kingsmore Stadium • Clemson, SC || W 10–5 || Barnes (4–4) || Wilder (3–2) || Eubanks (2) || 4,480 || 30–15 || 12–13 
|-bgcolor=ffbbb
| May 7 || #9 NC State ||  || Doug Kingsmore Stadium • Clemson, SC || L 9–20 || Brown (7–1) || Gilliam (2–2) || None || 4,957 || 30–16 || 12–14 
|-bgcolor=ccffcc
| May 8 || #9 NC State ||  || Doug Kingsmore Stadium • Clemson, SC || W 2–1 || Krall (8–1) || DeJuneas (2–2) || None || 4,239 || 31–16 || 13–14
|-bgcolor=ccffcc
| May 10 || * || #23 || Doug Kingsmore Stadium • Clemson, SC || W 13–3 || Andrews (1–0) || Hunt (0–1) || None || 4,768 || 32–16 || 
|-bgcolor=ffbbb
| May 11 || College of Charleston* || #23 || Doug Kingsmore Stadium • Clemson, SC || L 4–11 || Ocker (4–0) || Schmidt (5–4) || None || 3,602 || 32–17 || 
|-bgcolor=ccffcc
| May 13 || at * || #23 || J. I. Clements Stadium • Statesboro, GA || W' 12–1 || Barnes (5–4) || Challenger (5–4) || None || 1,108 || 33–17 || 
|-bgcolor=ffbbb
| May 14 || at Georgia Southern* || #23 || J. I. Clements Stadium • Statesboro, GA || L 6–7 || Hughes (4–2) || Eubanks (4–5) || None || 1,416 || 33–18 || 
|-bgcolor=ccffcc
| May 15 || at Georgia Southern* || #23 || J. I. Clements Stadium • Statesboro, GA || W 17–4 || Gilliam (3–2) || Simmons (3–2) || None || 1,059 || 34–18 || 
|-bgcolor=ccffcc
| May 17 || * || #23 || Doug Kingsmore Stadium • Clemson, SC || W 3–2 || Schmidt (6–4) || Piriz (2–5) || Eubanks (3) || 4,782 || 35–18 || 
|-bgcolor=ccffcc
| May 19 || at  || #18 || Frank Eck Stadium • Notre Dame, IN || W 2–111 || Crawford (3–0) || Guenther (3–5) || Krall (3) || 442 || 36–18 || 14–14
|-bgcolor=ccffcc
| May 20 || at Notre Dame || #18 || Frank Eck Stadium • Notre Dame, IN || W 11–1 || Schmidt (7–4) || Mearne (8–2) || None || 555 || 37–18 || 15–14 
|-bgcolor=ccffcc
| May 21 || at Notre Dame ||  #18  || Frank Eck Stadium • Notre Dame, IN || W 6–2 || Euobanks (5–5) || Cresta (0–1) || Krall (4) || 610 || 38–18 || 16–14
|-

|-
! style="" | Postseason
|- 

|-bgcolor=ccffcc
| May 26 || #8 Virginia || #15 || Durham Bulls Athletic Park • Durham, NC || W 5–4 || Krall (9–1) || Shambora (5–1) || None || 3,259 || 39–18 || 1–0
|-bgcolor=ccffcc
| May 27 || #3 Louisville || #15 || Durham Bulls Athletic Park • Durham, NC || W 5–3 || Schmidt (8–4) || McKay (11–3) || Krall (5) || 2,958 || 40–18 || 2–0
|-bgcolor=ccffcc
| May 28 || Wake Forest || #15 || Durham Bulls Athletic Park • Durham, NC || W 5–4 || Krall (10–1) || Dunshee (9–5) || None || 4,417 || 41–18 || 3–0
|-bgcolor=ccffc
| May 29 || #12 Florida State || #15 || Durham Bulls Athletic Park • Durham, NC || W 18–13 || Bostic (4–2) || E. Voyles (1–2) || None || 4,863 || 42–18 || 4–0
|-

|- bgcolor=ccffc
| June 3 || (4) Western Carolina || #9 (1) || Doug Kingsmore Stadium • Clemson, SC || W 24–10 || Barnes (6–4) || Anderson (1–4) || None || 5,589 || 43–18 || 1–0
|- bgcolor=ffbbb
| June 4 || #24 (2) Oklahoma State || #9 (1) || Doug Kingsmore Stadium • Clemson, SC || L 2–12 || Buffett (7–3) || Schmidt (8–5) || None || 5,629 || 43–19 || 1–1
|- bgcolor=ccffc
| June 5 (1) || (4) Western Carolina || #9 (1) || Doug Kingsmore Stadium • Clemson, SC || W 15–3 || Eubanks (6–5) || Bray (2–5) || None || 4,227 || 44–19 || 2–1
|- bgcolor=ffbbb
| June 5 (2) || #24 (2) Oklahoma State || #9 (1) || Doug Kingsmore Stadium • Clemson, SC || L 2–9 || Elliott (9–2) || Krall (10–2) || Cobb (3) || 4,407 || 44–20 || 2–2
|-

Rankings

2017

Personnel

Roster

Coaches

Schedule

! style="" | Regular Season
|- valign="top" 

|-bgcolor=ffbbb
| Feb 17 || * || #10 || Doug Kingsmore Stadium • Clemson, SC || L 4–6 || Foster (1–0) || Jackson (0–1) || Weiss (1) || 5,683 || 0–1 || 
|-bgcolor=ccffcc
| Feb 18 || Wright State* || #10 || Doug Kingsmore Stadium • Clemson, SC || W 6–2 || Krall (1–0) || Collins (0–1) || None || 4,360 || 1–1 || 
|-bgcolor=ffbbb
| Feb 19 || Wright State* || #10 || Doug Kingsmore Stadium • Clemson, SC || L 2–9 || Sexton (1–0) || Eubanks (0–1) || None || 5,239 || 1–2 || 
|-bgcolor=ccffcc
| Feb 22 || * || #12 || Doug Kingsmore Stadium • Clemson, SC || W 11–5 || Crawford (1–0) || Nail (0–2) || Gilliam (1) || 3,496 || 2–2 || 
|-bgcolor=ccffcc
| Feb 24 || * || #12 || Doug Kingsmore Stadium • Clemson, SC || W 1–013 || Crawford (2–0) || Kirby (0–1) || None || 5,394 || 3–2 || 
|-bgcolor=ccffcc
| Feb 25 || Elon* || #12 || Doug Kingsmore Stadium • Clemson, SC || W 13–5 || Krall (2–0) || Welhaf (1–1) || None || 5,665 || 4–2 || 
|-bgcolor=ccffcc
| Feb 26 || Elon* || #12 || Doug Kingsmore Stadium • Clemson, SC || W 3–0 || Eubanks (1–1) || Brnovich (0–1) || Hennessy (1) || 4,108 || 5–2 || 
|-bgcolor=ccffcc
| Feb 28 || * || #12 || Doug Kingsmore Stadium • Clemson, SC || W 9–2 || Jackson (1–1) || Ellmyer (0–1) || None || 3,604 || 6–2 || 
|-

|-bgcolor=ffbbb
| Mar 3 || #4 South Carolina* || #12 || Doug Kingsmore Stadium • Clemson, SC || L 0–2 || Schmidt (2–0) || Barnes (0–1) || Johnson (4) || 6,212 || 6–3 || 
|-bgcolor=ccffcc
| Mar 4 || at #4 South Carolina* || #12 || Fluor Field at the West End • Greenville, SC || W 8–7 || Gilliam (1–0) || Scott (0–1) || None || 7,460 || 7–3 || 
|-bgcolor=ccffcc
| Mar 5 || at #4 South Carolina* || #12 || Founders Park • Columbia, SC || W 5–3 (11) || Schnell (1–0) || Murray (0–1) || None || 8,242 || 8–3 || 
|-bgcolor=ccffcc
| Mar 8 || at * || #9 || Fluor Field at the West End • Greenville, SC || W 9–2  || Jackson (2–1) || Mockbee (3–1) || None || 3,176 || 9–3 || 
|-bgcolor=ccffcc
| Mar 10 ||  || #9 || Doug Kingsmore Stadium • Clemson, SC || W 4–1 || Barnes (1–1) || Bielack (0–3) || Hennessy (2) || 5,170 || 10–3 || 1–0
|-bgcolor=ccffcc
| Mar 11 || Notre Dame || #9 || Doug Kingsmore Stadium • Clemson, SC || W 6–5 || Crawford (3–0) || Smoyer (0–2) || None || 5,005 || 11–3 || 2–0
|-bgcolor=ccffcc
| Mar 12 || Notre Dame || #9 || Doug Kingsmore Stadium • Clemson, SC || W 4–0 || Eubanks (2–1) || Bass (1–2) || None || 3,707 || 12–3 || 3–0
|-bgcolor=ccffcc
| Mar 14 || * || #9 || Doug Kingsmore Stadium • Clemson, SC || W 10–6 || Hennessy (1–0) || Politz (2–1) || None || 3,372 || 13–3 || 
|-bgcolor=ccffcc
| Mar 15 || Yale* || #9 || Doug Kingsmore Stadium • Clemson, SC || W 10–8 || Crawford (4–0) || Sapsford (0–1) || None || 3,261 || 14–3 || 
|-bgcolor=ffbbb
| Mar 17 || #11  || #9 || Doug Kingsmore Stadium • Clemson, SC || L 0–2 || Lynch (4–1) || Barnes (1–2) || Doyle (4) || 3,995 || 14–4 || 3–1
|-bgcolor=ccffcc
| Mar 18 || #11 Virginia || #9 || Doug Kingsmore Stadium • Clemson, SC || W 7–6 || Eubanks (3–1) || Sperling (3–2) || Miller (1) || 4,490 || 15–4 || 4–1
|-bgcolor=ccffcc
| Mar 19 || #11 Virginia || #9 || Doug Kingsmore Stadium • Clemson, SC || W 12–1 || Krall (3–0) || Haseley (3–1) || None || 4,526 || 16–4 || 5–1
|-bgcolor=ccffcc
| Mar 21 || at * || #6 || CofC Baseball Stadium at Patriot's Point • Mount Pleasant, SC || W 8–4 || Jackson (3–1) || McKinley (0–3) || None || 1,638 || 17–4 || 
|-bgcolor=ccffcc
| Mar 24 || at  || #6 || Bill Beck Field • Kingston, RI || W 8–2 || Barnes (2–2) || Stevens (2–2) || Andrews (1) || 107 || 18–4 || 6–1
|-bgcolor=ccffcc
| Mar 25 || at Boston College || #6 || Bill Beck Field • Kingston, RI || W 1–0 || Eubanks (4–1) || Witkowski (0–1) || None || 336 || 19–4 || 7–1
|-bgcolor=ccffcc
| Mar 26 || at Boston College || #6 || Bill Beck Field • Kingston, RI || W 2–0  || Krall (4–0) || Stromberg (0–1) || Gilliam (2) || 227 || 20–4 || 8–1
|-bgcolor=ccffcc
| Mar 28 || * || #5 || Doug Kingsmore Stadium • Clemson, SC || W 8–0 || Jackson (4–0) || Verbeke (0–2) || None || 4,454 || 21–4 || 
|-bgcolor=ccffcc
| Mar 29 || * || #5 || Doug Kingsmore Stadium • Clemson, SC || W 6–5 (11) || Miller (1–0) || Whitaker (1–2) || None || 4,130 || 22–4 || 
|-bgcolor=ccffcc
| Mar 31 || at  || #5 || Russ Chandler Stadium • Atlanta, GA || W 11–6 || Barnes (3–2) || Curry (3–3) || None || 1,439 || 23–4 || 9–1
|-

|-bgcolor=ffbbb
| Apr 1 || at Georgia Tech || #5 || Russ Chandler Stadium • Atlanta, GA || L 5–1 || Shadday (2–1) || Eubanks (4–2) || None || 2,725 || 23–5 || 9–2
|-bgcolor=ccffcc
| Apr 2 || at Georgia Tech || #5 || Russ Chandler Stadium • Atlanta, GA || W13–6 || Krall (5–0) || Schniederjan 1–2 || None || 2,107 || 24–5 || 10–2
|-bgcolor=ccffcc
| Apr 4 || at * || #4 || Foley Field • Athens, GA || W 4–0 || Jackson (5–1) || Avidano (2–1) || None || 3,302 || 25–5 || 
|-bgcolor=ccffcc
| Apr 7 ||  || #4 || Doug Kingsmore Stadium • Clemson, SC || W (12–1) || Barnes (4–2) || Coward (5–1) || None || 4,995 || 26–5 || 11–2
|-bgcolor=ccffcc
| Apr 8 || Virginia Tech || #4 || Doug Kingsmore Stadium • Clemson, SC || W 6–3 || Eubanks (5–2) || Naughton (2–5) || Gilliam (3) || 6,104 || 27–5 || 12–2
|-bgcolor=ccffcc
| Apr 9 || Virginia Tech || #4 || Doug Kingsmore Stadium • Clemson, SC || W 8–3 || Krall (6–0) || Anderson (5–3) || None || 4,705 || 28–5 || 13–2
|-bgcolor=ccffcc
| Apr 11 || * || #4 || Doug Kingsmore Stadium • Clemson, SC || W 6–5 (11) || Beasley (1–0) || Hartsell (1–4) || None || 5,280 || 29–5 || 
|-bgcolor=ccffcc
| Apr 15 || at #25 Florida State || #4 || Mike Martin Field at Dick Howser Stadium • Tallahassee, FL || W 12–10 || Gilliam (2–0) || Carlton (2–3) || None || 5,753 || 30–5 || 14–2
|-bgcolor=ffbbb
| Apr 16 || at #25 Florida State || #4 || Mike Martin Field at Dick Howser Stadium • Tallahassee, FL || L 7–3 || Holton (5–1) || Eubanks (5–3) || None || 4,010 || 30–6 || 14–3 
|-bgcolor=ffbbb
| Apr 17 || at #25 Florida State || #4 || Mike Martin Field at Dick Howser Stadium • Tallahassee, FL || L 7–6 || Byrd (2–1) || Hennessy (1–1) || None || 4,046 || 30–7 || 14–4
|-bgcolor=ccffcc
| Apr 19 || Georgia* || #4 || Doug Kingsmore Stadium • Clemson, SC || W 9–7 || Jackson (6–1) || Shepard (0–2) || Hennessy (3) || 4,550 || 31–7 || 
|-bgcolor=ccffcc
| Apr 21 || #17 Wake Forest || #4 || Doug Kingsmore Stadium • Clemson, SC || W 8–7 || Hennessy (2–1) || Roberts (1–2) || None || 5,352 || 32–7 || 15–4
|-bgcolor=ccffcc
| Apr 22 || #17 Wake Forest || #4 || Doug Kingsmore Stadium • Clemson, SC || W 11–0 || Eubanks (6–3) || Sellers (3–3) || None || – || 33–7 || 16–4
|-bgcolor=ffbbb
| Apr 22 || #17 Wake Forest || #4 || Doug Kingsmore Stadium • Clemson, SC || L 8–3 || Johnstone (6–0) || Krall (6–1) || None || 6,030 || 33–8 || 16–5
|-bgcolor=ccffcc
| Apr 25 || College of Charleston || #3 || Doug Kingsmore Stadium • Clemson, SC || W 7–2 || Jackson (7–1) || White (1–5) || None || 4,232 || 34–8 || 
|-bgcolor=ffbbb
| Apr 28 || at #3  || #3 || Boshamer Stadium • Chapel Hill, NC || L 5–1 || Bukauskas (8–0) || Barnes (4–3) || None || 3,720 || 34–9 || 16–6
|-bgcolor=ffbbb
| Apr 29 || at #3 North Carolina || #3 || Boshamer Stadium • Chapel Hill, NC || L 5–4 || Daniels (4–0) || Gilliam (2–1) || Hiatt (13) || 3,514 || 34–10 || 16–7
|-bgcolor=ffbbb
| Apr 30 || at #3 North Carolina || #3 || Boshamer Stadium • Chapel Hill, NC || L 3–2 (10) || Hiatt (2–1) || Beasley (1–1) || None || 2,880 || 34–11 || 16–8
|-

|-bgcolor=ccffcc
| May 6 || * || #6 || Doug Kingsmore Stadium • Clemson, SC || W 5–2 || Barnes (5–3) || Charpie (2–6) || Beasley (1) || 4,042 || 35–11 || 
|-bgcolor=ffbbb
| May 7 || Nevada* || #6 || Doug Kingsmore Stadium • Clemson, SC || L 7–5 || Nowaczewski (4–5) || Eubanks (6–4) || McMahan (5) || 4,168 || 35–12 || 
|-bgcolor=ccffcc
| May 8 || Nevada* || #6 || Doug Kingsmore Stadium • Clemson, SC || W 9–4 || Krall (7–1) || Ohl (3–2) || Gilliam (4) || 3,824 || 36–12 || 
|-bgcolor=ccffcc
| May 9 || at Furman* || #7 || Fluor Field at the West End • Greenville, SC || W 10–5 || Jackson (8–1) || Crawford (1–4) || None || 4,138 || 37–12 || 
|-bgcolor=ffbbb
| May 12 || #2 Louisville || #7 || Doug Kingsmore Stadium • Clemson, SC || L 4–2 || McKay (8–3) || Barnes (5–4) || Henzman (15) || 4,405 || 37–13 || 16–9
|-bgcolor=ffbbb
| May 13 || #2 Louisville || #7 || Doug Kingsmore Stadium • Clemson, SC || L 6–4 || McClure (7–1) || Beasley (1–2) || Wolf (1) || 5,164 || 37–14 || 16–10
|-bgcolor=ffbbb
| May 14 || #2 Louisville || #7 || Doug Kingsmore Stadium • Clemson, SC || L 6–4 || Bennett (5–0) || Krall (7–2) || Henzman (16) || 4,572 || 37–15 || 16–11
|-bgcolor=ccffcc
| May 16 || #24 Coastal Carolina* || #12 || Doug Kingsmore Stadium • Clemson, SC || W 11–8 || Gilliam (3–1) || Bilous (3–2) || None || 5,138 || 38–15 || 
|-bgcolor=ffbbb
| May 18 || at  || #12 || Doak Field • Raleigh, NC || L 3–2 || Staley (2–3) || Griffith (0–1) || Adler (1) || 2,628 || 38–16 || 16–12  
|-bgcolor=ffbbb
| May 19 || at NC State || #12 || Doak Field • Raleigh, NC || L 12–10 || Brown (4–1) || Eubanks (6–5) || Adler (2) || 3,048 || 38–17 || 16–13
|-bgcolor=ccffcc
| May 20 || at NC State || #12 || Doak Field • Raleigh, NC || W 15–6 || Krall (8–2) || Bienlien (3–3) || None || 3,048 || 39–17 || 17–13
|-

|-
! style="" | Postseason
|- 

|-bgcolor=ffbbb
| May 23 || Duke || #14 || Louisville Slugger Field • Louisville, KY || L 6–3 || Hendrix (3–1) || Griffith (0–2) || None || 3,381 || 39–18 || 0–1
|-bgcolor=ffbbb
| May 26 || #10 Virginia || #14 || Jim Patterson Stadium • Louisville, KY || L 10–2 || Lynch (7–4) || Krall (8–3) || None || 598 || 39–19 || 0–2
|-

|-bgcolor=ccffcc 
| June 2 || (4) UNC Greensboro || #15 (1) || Doug Kingsmore Stadium • Clemson, SC || W 5–4 || Eubanks (7–5) || Hensley (7–8) || Krall (1) || 5,095 || 40–19 || 1–0  
|-bgcolor=ffbbb
| June 3 || (2) Vanderbilt || #15 (1) || Doug Kingsmore Stadium • Clemson, SC || L 9–4 || Wright (5–5) || Barnes (5–5) || None || 5,097 || 40–20 || 1–1 
|-bgcolor=ccffcc
| June 4 || (4) UNC Greensboro || #15 (1) || Doug Kingsmore Stadium • Clemson, SC || W 6–3 || Griffith (1–2) || Loats (8–3) || None || 3,571 || 41–20 || 2–1
|-bgcolor=ccffcc
| June 4 || (2) Vanderbilt || #15 (1) || Doug Kingsmore Stadium • Clemson, SC || W 6–0 || Jackson (9–1) || Fellows (3–3) || None || 3,731 || 42–20 || 3–1
|-bgcolor=ffbbb
| June 5 || (2) Vanderbilt || #15 (1) || Doug Kingsmore Stadium • Clemson, SC || L 8–0 || Ruppenthal (3–3) || Eubanks (7–6) || None || 4,462 || 42–21 || 3–2
|-

| 

Rankings

2018

Personnel

Roster

Coaches

Schedule

! style="" | Regular Season
|- valign="top" 

|-bgcolor=ccffcc
| Feb 16 || * || 12 || Doug Kingsmore Stadium • Clemson, SC || W 5–4 || Gilliam (1–0)  || Strain (0–1) || None || 6,062 || 1–0 || 0–0
|-bgcolor=ccffcc
| Feb 17 || William & Mary* || 12 || Doug Kingsmore Stadium • Clemson, SC || W 7–6 || Strider (1–0) || Sujak (0–1) || Spiers (1) || 4,711 || 2–0 || 0–0
|-bgcolor=ccffcc
| Feb 18 || William & Mary* || 12 || Doug Kingsmore Stadium • Clemson, SC || W 2–1 || Higginbotham (1–0) || Haney (0–1) || Gilliam (1) || 5,406 || 3–0 || 0–0
|-bgcolor=ccffcc
| Feb 20 || * || 11 || Doug Kingsmore Stadium • Clemson, SC || W 12–4 || Miller (1–0) || Verbeke (1–1) || None || 4,417 || 4–0  || 0–0
|-bgcolor=ccffcc
| Feb 23 || * || 11 || Doug Kingsmore Stadium • Clemson, SC || W 12–1 || Hennessy (1–0) || Johnson (1–1) || None || 5,313 || 5–0 || 0–0
|-bgcolor=ccffcc
| Feb 24 || #10 Dallas Baptist* || 11 || Doug Kingsmore Stadium • Clemson, SC || W 9–1 || Crawford (1–0) || Martinson (0–1) || Strider (1) || 4,842 || 6–0 || 0–0
|-bgcolor=ccffcc
| Feb 24 || #10 Dallas Baptist* || 11 || Doug Kingsmore Stadium • Clemson, SC || W 3–2 || Higginbotham (2–0) || Eldred (1–1) || Gilliam (2) || 4,842 || 7–0 || 0–0
|-bgcolor=ccffcc
| Feb 27 || * || 10 || Doug Kingsmore Stadium • Clemson, SC || W 9–8 (10)  || Clark (1–0) || Ohs (0–1) || None || 4,543 || 8–0 || 0–0 
|-

|- bgcolor=ffbbb
| Mar 2 || at #23 South Carolina* || 10 || Founders Park • Columbia, SC || L 2–3 ||  Demurias (1–0) || Gilliam (1–1) || None || 8,242 || 8–1 || 0–0 
|- bgcolor=ccffcc
| Mar 3 || vs #23 South Carolina* || 10 || Fluor Field at the West End • Greenville, SC || W 5–1 || Clark (2–0) || Morris (2–1) || Miller (1) || 7,385 || 9–1 || 0–0 
|- bgcolor=ccffcc
| Mar 4 || #23 South Carolina* || 10 || Doug Kingsmore Stadium • Clemson, SC || W 8–7 || Gilliam (2–1) || Mlodzinsk (0–2) || None || 6,312 || 10–1 || 0–0 
|- bgcolor=ccffcc
| Mar 6 || * || 10 || Doug Kingsmore Stadium • Clemson, SC || W 6–3 || Spiers (1–0) || Hershman (0–1) || None || 4,273 || 11–1 || 0–0
|- bgcolor=ccffcc
| Mar 7 || vs * || 10 || Fluor Field at the West End • Greenville, SC || W 9–7 || Jones (1–0) || Flohr (0–2) || Spiers (2) || 3,975 || 12–1 || 0–0
|- bgcolor=ccffcc
| Mar 9 ||  || 10 || Doug Kingsmore Stadium • Clemson, SC || W 3–2 || Miller (2–0) || Datoc (0–2) || None || 4,800 || 13–1 || 1–0
|- bgcolor=ccffcc
| Mar 10 || Georgia Tech || 10 || Doug Kingsmore Stadium • Clemson, SC || W 7–3 || Strider (2–0) || Thomas (2–1) || Spiers (3) || 5,959 || 14–1 || 2–0 
|- bgcolor=ccffcc
| Mar 10 || Georgia Tech || 10 || Doug Kingsmore Stadium • Clemson, SC || W 13–2 || Higginbotham (3–0) || Hurter (0–1) || None || 5,959 || 15–1 || 3–0 
|- bgcolor=ccffcc
| Mar 13 || * || 5 || Doug Kingsmore Stadium • Clemson, SC || W 5–0 || Jones (2–0) || Bennett (0–2) || None || 4,486 || 16–1 || 3–0 
|- bgcolor=ffbbb
| Mar 16 || #23 NC State || 5 || Doug Kingsmore Stadium • Clemson, SC || L 0–4 || Bienlien (2–0) || Hennessy (1–1) || Klyman (3) || 4,679 || 16–2 || 3–1
|- bgcolor=ffbbb
| Mar 17 || #23 NC State || 5 || Doug Kingsmore Stadium • Clemson, SC || L 1–6 || Brown (4–0) || Crawford (1–1) || Johnston (4) || 5,008 || 16–3 || 3–2
|- bgcolor=ffbbb
| Mar 18 || #23 NC State || 5 || Doug Kingsmore Stadium • Clemson, SC || L 4–5 || O'Donnell (1–1) || Miller (2–1) || None || 4,540 || 16–4 || 3–3
|- bgcolor=ffbbb
| Mar 20 || at Coastal Carolina* || 12 || Springs Brooks Stadium • Conway, SC || L 5–9 || Causey (1–0) || Spiers (1–1) || None || 4,130 || 16–5 || 3–3
|- bgcolor=ccffcc
| Mar 23 || at #17  || 12 || Jim Patterson Stadium • Louisville, KY || W 3–1 || Hennessy (2–1) || Wolf (3–1) || Miller (2) || 2,519 || 17–5 || 4–3
|- bgcolor=ccffcc
| Mar 25 || at #17 Louisville || 12 || Jim Patterson Stadium • Louisville, KY || W 4–3 || Marr (1–0) || Smiddy (2–1) || Gilliam (3) || 2,587 || 18–5 || 5–3
|- bgcolor=ffbbb
| Mar 25 || at #17 Louisville || 12 || Jim Patterson Stadium • Louisville, KY || L 1–5 || Bennett (2–0) || Higginbotham (3–1) || None || 2,587  || 18–6 || 5–4 
|- bgcolor=ccffcc
| Mar 27 || at Furman* || 12 || Fluor Field at the West End • Greenville, SC || W 10–5 || Marr (2–0) || Alley (2–2) || None || 2,249 || 19–6 || 5–4
|- bgcolor=ccffcc
| Mar 29 ||  || 12 || Doug Kingsmore Stadium • Clemson, SC || W 10–2 || Hennessy (3–1) ||  Stevens (3–3) || None || 4,301 || 20–6 || 6–4
|- bgcolor=ccffcc
| Mar 30 || Boston College || 12 || Doug Kingsmore Stadium • Clemson, SC || W 9–4 || Crawford (2–1) || Metzdorf (0–4) || Miller (3) || 5,088 || 21–6 || 7–4
|- bgcolor=ccffcc
| Mar 31 || Boston College || 12 || Doug Kingsmore Stadium • Clemson, SC || W 8–3 || Marr (3–0) || Rapp (2–3) || Gilliam (4) || 5,324 || 22–6 || 8–4
|-

|- bgcolor=ccffcc
| Apr 3 || #18 Coastal Carolina* || 8 || Doug Kingsmore Stadium • Clemson, SC || W 6–1 || Strider (3–0) || Peavyhouse (1–3) || None || 6,540 || 23–6 || 8–4 
|- bgcolor=ffbbb
| Apr 6 || at  || 8 || Frank Eck Stadium • Notre Dame, IN || L 2–5 || Tully (4–1) || Hennessy (3–2) || Kmet (5) || 414 || 23–7 || 8–5
|- bgcolor=ccffcc
| Apr 8 || at Notre Dame || 8 || Frank Eck Stadium • Notre Dame, IN || W 6–3 || Crawford (3–1) || Sheehan (1–3) || None || 326 || 24–7 || 9–5
|- bgcolor=ccffcc
| Apr 8 || at Notre Dame || 8 || Frank Eck Stadium • Notre Dame, IN || W 5–2 || Higginbotham (4–1) || Junker (0–3) || Gilliam (5) || 326 || 25–7 || 10–5
|- bgcolor=ffbbb
| Apr 10 || vs #21 * || 7 || SRP Park • North Augusta, SC || L 3–6 ||  Smith (5–1) || Strider (3–1) || Schunk (5) || 5,801 || 25–8 || 10–5
|- bgcolor=ffbbb
| Apr 13 || Miami (FL) || 7 || Doug Kingsmore Stadium • Clemson, SC || L 11–12 (12) || Bartow (2–0) || Spiers (1–2) ||  None || 5,350 || 25–9 || 10–6
|- bgcolor=ffbbb
| Apr 14 || Miami (FL) || 7 || Doug Kingsmore Stadium • Clemson, SC || L 1–6 || McKendry (5–4) || Crawford (3–2) || None || 6,513 || 25–10 || 10–7
|- bgcolor=ccffcc
| Apr 14 || Miami (FL) || 7 || Doug Kingsmore Stadium • Clemson, SC || W 8–3 || Higginbotham (5–1) || Cabezas (3–4) || None || 6,513 || 26–10 || 11–7
|- bgcolor=ffbbb
| Apr 17 || at #24 Georgia* || 14 || Foley Field • Athens, GA || L 1–6 || Proctor (3–2) || Marr (3–1) || None || 2,822 || 26–11 || 11–7
|- bgcolor=ccffcc
| Apr 20 || at  || 14 || Gene Hooks Field • Winston-Salem, NC || W 7–5 || Miller (3–1) || Witt (0–3) || None || 1,352 || 27–11 || 12–7 
|- bgcolor=ccffcc
| Apr 21 || at Wake Forest || 14 || Gene Hooks Field • Winston-Salem, NC || W 4–3 || Crawford (4–2)|| Supple (3–2) || Gilliam (6) || 1,864 || 28–11 || 13–7
|- bgcolor=ccffcc
| Apr 22 || at Wake Forest || 14 || Gene Hooks Field • Winston-Salem, NC || W 9–4 || Higginbotham (6–1) || Peluse (6–1) || Gilliam (7) || 1,319 || 29–11 || 14–7
|- bgcolor=ccffcc
| Apr 24 || * || 14 || Doug Kingsmore Stadium • Clemson, SC || W 9–4 || Strider (4–1) ||  Dupree (1–1) || Miller (4) || 4,330 || 30–11 || 14–7
|- bgcolor=ccffcc
| Apr 25 || * || 14 || Doug Kingsmore Stadium • Clemson, SC || W 14–4 || Marr (4–1) || Jahn (0–2) || None || 4,933 || 31–11 || 14–7 
|- bgcolor=ccffcc
| Apr 27 || at  || 14 || Davenport Field • Charlottesville, VA || W 3–2 || Hennessey (4–2) || Casey (5–3) || Gilliam (8) || 3,455 || 32–11 || 15–7
|- bgcolor=ccffcc
| Apr 28 || at Virginia || 14 || Davenport Field • Charlottesville, VA || W 5–4 || Crawford (5–2) || Lynch (3–4) || Gilliam (9) || 4,395 || 33–11 || 16–7
|- bgcolor=ccffcc
| Apr 29 || at Virginia || 14 || Davenport Field • Charlottesville, VA || W 9–8 || Miller (4–1) || Murdock (1–1) || Gilliam (10) || 4,376 || 34–11 || 17–7
|-

|- bgcolor=ffbbb
| May 5 || #16  || 10 || Doug Kingsmore Stadium • Clemson, SC || L 2–3 (13) || Van Eyk (3–0)  || Gilliam (2–2) || None || 5,379 || 34–12 || 17–8
|- bgcolor=ccffcc
| May 6 || #16 Florida State || 10 || Doug Kingsmore Stadium • Clemson, SC || W 12–7 || Crawford (6–2) || Karp (7–4) || None || 5,075 || 35–12 || 18–8
|- bgcolor=ccffcc
| May 7 || #16 Florida State || 10 || Doug Kingsmore Stadium • Clemson, SC || W 5–4 || Spiers (2–2) || Grady (4–3) || None || 4,655 || 36–12 || 19–8 
|- bgcolor=ccffcc
| May 9 || * || 8 || Doug Kingsmore Stadium • Clemson, SC || W 10–8 || Marr (5–1) || Therrian (0–4) || Griffith (1) || 4,852 || 37–12 || 19–8  
|- bgcolor=ffbbb
| May 11 || * || 8 || Doug Kingsmore Stadium • Clemson, SC || L 3–6 || Costanzo (9–1) || Hennessy (4–3) || Newberg (6) || 4,496 || 37–13 || 19–8 
|- bgcolor=ccffcc
| May 12 || Austin Peay* || 8 || Doug Kingsmore Stadium • Clemson, SC || W 10–1 || Crawford (7–2) || Pucheu (7–2) || Spiers (4) || 4,646 || 38–13 || 19–8
|- bgcolor=ccffcc
| May 13 || Austin Peay* || 8 || Doug Kingsmore Stadium • Clemson, SC || W 3–2 (11) || Marr (6–1) || Gollert (3–3) || None || 4,187 || 39–13 || 19–8
|- bgcolor=ccffcc
| May 15 || at Kennesaw State* || 9 || Fred Stillwell Stadium • Kennesaw, GA || W 7–2 || Clark (3–0) || Kennedy (2–7) || None || 1,282 || 40–13 || 19–8
|- bgcolor=ccffcc
| May 17 || at  || 9 || Cost Field • Pittsburgh, PA || W 16–6 || Strider (5–1) || Pidich (5–2) || None || 378 || 41–13 || 20–8
|- bgcolor=ccffcc
| May 18 || at Pittsburgh || 9 || Cost Field • Pittsburgh, PA || W 4–1 || Crawford (8–2) || Hammer (2–5) || Gilliam (11) || 376 || 42–13 || 21–8 
|- bgcolor=ccffcc
| May 19 || at Pittsburgh || 9 || Cost Field • Pittsburgh, PA || W 5–0 || Miller (5–1) || Gomez (2–1) || None || 501 || 43–13 || 22–8 
|-

|-
! style="" | Postseason
|- 

|- bgcolor=ccffcc
| May 23 || Notre Dame || 5 || Durham Bulls Athletic Park • Durham, NC || W 21–4 (7) || Clark (4–0) || Brown (2–2) || None || 2,427 || 44–13 || 1–0 
|- bgcolor=ccffcc
| May 24 || Miami || 5 || Durham Bulls Athletic Park • Durham, NC || W 7–1 || Miller (6–1) || Bargfeldt (4–5) || None || 3,154 || 45–13 || 2–0
|- bgcolor=ffbbb
| May 26 || #13 Florida State || 5 || Durham Bulls Athletic Park • Durham, NC || L 4–5 || Van Eyk (7–0) || Gilliam (2–3) || None || 5,478 || 45–14 || 2–1
|-

|- bgcolor=ccffcc
| June 1 || 4 ||  || 1 || Doug Kingsmore Stadium • Clemson, SC || W 4–3 (10) || Gilliam (3–3) || Conway (8–4) || None || 5,060 || 46–14 || 1–0
|- bgcolor=ffbbb
| June 2 || 2 ||  || 1 || Doug Kingsmore Stadium • Clemson, SC || L 3–4 || Raby (5–5) || Marr (6–2) || Day (4) || 5,263 || 46–15 || 1–1
|- bgcolor=ccffcc
| June 3 || 3 ||  || 1 || Doug Kingsmore Stadium • Clemson, SC || W 9–8 || Miller (7–1) || Belege (6–4) || None || 3,837 || 47–15 || 2–1 
|- bgcolor=ffbbb
| June 3 || 2 || Vanderbilt || 1 || Doug Kingsmore Stadium • Clemson, SC || L 6–19 || Hickman (8–2) || Strider (5–2) || None || 4,360 || 47–16 || 2–2
|-

|-
| style="font-size:88%" | Note: All rankings shown are from Baseball America Poll.

Rankings

2019

Personnel

Roster

Coaches

Schedule

! style="" | Regular Season
|- valign="top" 

|-bgcolor=ccffcc
| Feb 15 || * || No. 15 || Doug Kingsmore Stadium • Clemson, SC || W 6–2 || Clark (1–0) || Proctor (0–1) || Spiers (1) || 4,435 || 1–0 || 0–0
|-bgcolor=ccffcc
| Feb 16 || South Alabama* || No. 15 || Doug Kingsmore Stadium • Clemson, SC || W 7–2 || Sharpe (1–0) || Booker (0–1) || None || 5,678 || 2–0 || 0–0
|-bgcolor=ffbbb
| Feb 16 || South Alabama* || No. 15 || Doug Kingsmore Stadium • Clemson, SC || L 3–4 || Dalton (1–0) || Wrobleski (0–1) || Greene (1) || 5,678 || 2–1 || 0–0
|-bgcolor=ccffcc
| Feb 18 || * || No. 15 || Doug Kingsmore Stadium • Clemson, SC || W 7–6 || Askew (1–0) || McGowan (1–1) || Spiers (2) || 4,075 || 3–1 || 0–0
|- style="background:#bbb;"
| Feb 20 || * || No. 15 || Doug Kingsmore Stadium • Clemson, SC || Postponed ||  ||  ||  ||  ||  || 
|- bgcolor=ccffcc
| Feb 23 || * || No. 15 || Doug Kingsmore Stadium • Clemson, SC || W 8–6 || Clark (2–0) || Light (0–2) || Spiers (3) || 4,353 || 4–1 || 0–0
|- bgcolor=ccffcc
| Feb 23 || VMI* || No. 15 || Doug Kingsmore Stadium • Clemson, SC || W 8–2 || Sharpe (2–0) || Jewell (0–1) || None || 4,353 || 5–1 || 0–0
|- bgcolor=ccffcc
| Feb 24 || VMI* || No. 15 || Doug Kingsmore Stadium • Clemson, SC || W 11–6 || Weatherly (1–0) || Tremblay (0–2) || None || 4,098 || 6–1 || 0–0
|- bgcolor=ccffcc
| Feb 26 || * || No. 15 || Doug Kingsmore Stadium • Clemson, SC || W 14–3 || Askew (2–0) || Stuart (1–1) || None || 4,069 || 7–1 || 0–0 
|-

|-bgcolor=ffbbb
| Mar 1 || No. 30 South Carolina*Rivalry || No. 15 || Doug Kingsmore Stadium • Clemson, SC || L 4–5 || Sweatt (1–0) || Crawford (0–1) || Kerry (2) || 5,933 || 7–2 || 0–0
|-bgcolor=ccffcc
| Mar 2 || vs No. 30 South Carolina*Rivalry || No. 15 || Fluor Field at the West End • Greenville, SC || W 11–5 || Weatherly (2–0) || Harley (0–1) || Jones (1) || 7,432 ||  8–2 || 0–0 
|-bgcolor=ffbbb
| Mar 3 || at No. 30 South Carolina*Rivalry || No. 15 || Founders Park • Columbia, SC || L 3–14 || Morgan (2–0) || Wrobleski (0–2) || None || 8,242 || 8–3 || 0–0 
|-bgcolor=ccffcc
| Mar 5 || at * || No. 20 || Fluor Field at the West End • Greenville, SC || W 3–1 || Hennessy (1–0)  || Bertrand (0–1) || Spiers (4) || 2,921 || 9–3 || 0–0  
|-bgcolor=ccffcc
| Mar 9 || No. 4 North Carolina || No. 20 || Doug Kingsmore Stadium • Clemson, SC || W 3–2 || Hennessy (2–0) || Lancellotti (0–1) || None || 5,668 || 10–3 || 1–0
|-bgcolor=ccffcc
| Mar 9 || No. 4 North Carolina || No. 20 || Doug Kingsmore Stadium • Clemson, SC || W 17–3 || Clark (3–0) || Baum (3–1) || None || 5,668 || 11–3 || 2–0
|-bgcolor=ccffcc
| Mar 10 || No. 4 North Carolina || No. 20 || Doug Kingsmore Stadium • Clemson, SC || W 5–4 || Spiers (1–0) || Love (4–1) || None || 4,565 || 12–3 || 3–0
|-bgcolor=ccffcc
| Mar 13 || No. 11 Coastal Carolina* || No. 12 || Doug Kingsmore Stadium • Clemson, SC || W 8–5 || Griffith (1–0) || Kobos (1–2) || Spiers (5) || 4,851 || 13–3 || 3–0
|-bgcolor=ffbbb
| Mar 15 ||  || No. 12 || Doug Kingsmore Stadium • Clemson, SC || L 2–9 || T. Sheehan (3–1) || Sharpe (2–1) || None || 4,301 || 13–4 || 3–1
|-bgcolor=ccffcc
| Mar 16 || Notre Dame || No. 12 || Doug Kingsmore Stadium • Clemson, SC || W 5–1 || Clark (4–0) || Brown (0–2) || Jones (2) || 4,835 || 14–4 || 4–1
|-bgcolor=ffbbb
| Mar 17 || Notre Dame || No. 12 || Doug Kingsmore Stadium • Clemson, SC || L 2–4 (10) || Boyle (1–0) || Spiers (1–1) || Megias (1) || 4,667 || 14–5 || 4–2
|-bgcolor=ccffcc
| Mar 19 || * || No. 20 || Doug Kingsmore Stadium • Clemson, SC || W 13–1 || Crawford (1–1) || Cook (3–2) || None || 4,273 || 15–5 || 4–2
|-bgcolor=ccffcc
| Mar 20 || at College of Charleston* || No. 20 || CofC Baseball Stadium at Patriot's Point • Mount Pleasant, SC || W 4–1 || Marr (1–0) || Williams (0–2) || Spiers (6) || 3,815 || 16–5 || 4–2 
|-bgcolor=ccffcc
| Mar 22 || at  || No. 20 || Brighton Field • Brighton, MA || W 8–1 || Sharpe (3–1) || Metzdorf (2–2) || None || 208 || 17–5 || 5–2 
|-bgcolor=ccffcc
| Mar 23 || at Boston College || No. 20 || Brighton Field • Brighton, MA || W 9–5 || Clark (5–0) || Gill (2–3) || Spiers (7) || 352 || 18–5 || 6–2 
|-bgcolor=ffbbb
| Mar 24 || at Boston College || No. 20 || Brighton Field • Brighton, MA || L 2–3 || Pelio (3–1) || Askew (2–1) || Walsh (2) || 535 || 18–6 || 6–3 
|-bgcolor=ccffcc
| Mar 26 || at Charlotte* || No. 15 || BB&T Ballpark • Charlotte, NC || W 8–5 || Jones (1–0) || Bruce (0–3) || None || 5,183 || 19–6 || 6–3 
|-bgcolor=ccffcc
| Mar 29 || at  || No. 15 || English Field • Blacksburg, VA || W 6–4 || Sharpe (4–1) || Seymour (4–1) || Spiers (8) || 809 || 20–6 || 7–3
|-bgcolor=ccffcc
| Mar 30 || at Virginia Tech || No. 15 || English Field • Blacksburg, VA || W 14–1 || Clark (6–0) || Alford (1–3) || None || 1,486 || 21–6 || 8–3
|-bgcolor=ccffcc
| Mar 31 || at Virginia Tech || No. 15 || English Field • Blacksburg, VA || W 12–9 || Jones (2–0) || Dellinger (1–3) || None || 307 || 22–6 || 9–3
|-

|-bgcolor=ffbbb
| Apr 2 || No. 7 Georgia* || No. 13 || Doug Kingsmore Stadium • Clemson, SC || L 3–5 || Elliot (4–1) || Crawford (1–2) || Schunk (10) || 5,170 || 22–7 || 9–3
|-bgcolor=ccffcc
| Apr 5 || No. 16 Louisville || No. 13 || Doug Kingsmore Stadium • Clemson, SC || W 5–1 || Sharpe (5–1) || Detmers (5–2) || Jones (3) || 5,474 || 23–7 || 10–3 
|-bgcolor=ccffcc
| Apr 6 || No. 16 Louisville || No. 13 || Doug Kingsmore Stadium • Clemson, SC || W 6–3 || Clark (7–0) || Bennett (4–2) || Spiers (9) || 5,640 || 24–7 || 11–3 
|-bgcolor=ffbbb
| Apr 7 || No. 16 Louisville || No. 13 || Doug Kingsmore Stadium • Clemson, SC || L 4–7 (11) || Kirian (2–0) || Spiers (1–2) || None || 4,633 || 24–8 || 11–4 
|-style="background:#bbb;"
| Apr 9 || * || No. 13 || Doug Kingsmore Stadium • Clemson, SC || colspan=7|Canceled
|-bgcolor=ccffcc
| Apr 10 || Furman* || No. 13 || Doug Kingsmore Stadium • Clemson, SC || W 2–0 || Hennessy (3–0) || Verbeke (0–4) || Crawford (1) || 4,724 || 25–8 || 11–4 
|-bgcolor=ffbbb
| Apr 12 || at Florida State || No. 13 || Mike Martin Field at Dick Howser Stadium • Tallahassee, FL || L 2–6 || Parrish (4–3) || Sharpe (5–2) || Flowers (7) || 4,246 || 25–9 || 11–5
|-bgcolor=ffbbb
| Apr 13 || at Florida State || No. 13 || Mike Martin Field at Dick Howser Stadium • Tallahassee, FL || L 2–16 || Van Eyk (4–3) || Clark (7–1) || None || 4,666 || 25–10 || 11–6
|-bgcolor=ffbbb
| Apr 14 || at Florida State ||  No. 13|| Mike Martin Field at Dick Howser Stadium • Tallahassee, FL || L 4–6 || Grady (6–3) || Crawford (1–3) || Flowers (8) || 3,923 || 25–11 || 11–7
|-bgcolor=ffbbb
| Apr 16 || at No. 5 Georgia* || No. 16 || Foley Field • Athens, GA || L 2–3 (20) || Pasqua (1–0) || Sommerfield (0–1) || None || 3,419 || 25–12 || 11–7 
|-bgcolor=ffbbb
| Apr 19 || Duke || No. 16 || Doug Kingsmore Stadium • Clemson, SC || L 8–9 || Dockman (4–1) || Griffith (1–1) || Girard (6) || 4,552 || 25–13 || 11–8
|-bgcolor=ffbbb
| Apr 20 || Duke || No. 16 || Doug Kingsmore Stadium • Clemson, SC || L 3–5 || Carey (2–0) || Crawford (1–4) || None || 4,906 || 25–14 || 11–9
|-bgcolor=ffbbb
| Apr 21 || Duke || No. 16 || Doug Kingsmore Stadium • Clemson, SC || L 8–9 || Davis (1–2) || Spiers (1–3) || None || 4,333 || 25–15 || 11–10
|-bgcolor=ffbbb
| Apr 23 || * ||  || Doug Kingsmore Stadium • Clemson, SC || L 6–8 || Whitaker (2–1) || Griffith (1–2) || Rendon (4) || 4,638 || 25–16 || 11–10
|-bgcolor=ccffcc
| Apr 24 || * ||  || Doug Kingsmore Stadium • Clemson, SC || W 7–4 || Lindley (1–0) || Noel (0–1) || Spiers (10) || 4,572 || 26–16 || 11–10
|-bgcolor=ffbbb
| Apr 26 || at No. 17  ||  || Russ Chandler Stadium • Atlanta, GA || L 7–8 || Hughes (7–2) || Sharpe (5–3) || None || 1,385 || 26–17 || 11–11
|-bgcolor=ffbbb
| Apr 27 || at No. 17 Georgia Tech ||  || Russ Chandler Stadium • Atlanta, GA || L 8–13 || Chapman (2–0) || Spiers (1–4) || None || 2,237 || 26–18 || 11–12
|-bgcolor=ccffcc
| Apr 28 || at No. 17 Georgia Tech ||  || Russ Chandler Stadium • Atlanta, GA || W 11–7 || Marr (2–0) || Carpenter (0–1) || None || 1,863 || 27–18 || 12–12
|-

|-bgcolor=ccffcc
| May 4 || * ||  || Doug Kingsmore Stadium • Clemson, SC || W 10–2 || Sharpe (6–3) || Campbell (2–4) || None || 4,609 || 28–18 || 12–12
|-bgcolor=ffbbb
| May 5 || at Gardner–Webb* ||  || Keeter Stadium • Shelby, NC || L 7–9 || Mitchell (6–4) || Hennessy (3–1) || None || 1,422 || 28–19 || 12–12
|-bgcolor=ffbbb
| May 7 || Presbyterian†* ||  || Doug Kingsmore Stadium • Clemson, SC || L 7–8 || Dearman (3–3) || Sommerfield (0–2) || Cook (2) || 4,461 || 28–20 || 12–12
|-bgcolor=ccffcc
| May 8 || The Citadel* ||  || Doug Kingsmore Stadium • Clemson, SC || W 17–3 || Lindley (2–0) || Bialakis (0–6) || None || 4,890 || 29–20 || 12–12 
|-bgcolor=ffbbb
| May 10 || at No. 20 NC State ||  || Doak Field • Raleigh, NC || L 1–6 || Swiney (6–0) || Clark (7–2) || None || 3,048 || 29–21 || 12–13
|-bgcolor=ccffcc
| May 11 || at No. 20 NC State ||  || Doak Field • Raleigh, NC || W 4–3 (10) || Spiers (2–4) || Klyman (5–2) || None || 2,929 || 30–21 || 13–13
|-bgcolor=ffbbb
| May 12 || at No. 20 NC State ||  || Doak Field • Raleigh, NC || L 3–8 || Cotter (5–3) || Jones (2–1) || None || 2,704 || 30–22 || 13–14
|-bgcolor=ccffcc
| May 14 || at Coastal Carolina* ||  || Springs Brooks Stadium • Conway, SC || W 14–3 || Griffith (2–2) || McDaniels (0–3) || None || 3,519 || 31–22 || 13–14
|-bgcolor=ccffcc
| May 16 ||  ||  || Doug Kingsmore Stadium • Clemson, SC || W 4–3 || Clark (8–2) || Peluse (3–8) || Spiers (11) || 4,425 || 32–22 || 14–14
|-bgcolor=ccffcc
| May 17 || Wake Forest ||  || Doug Kingsmore Stadium • Clemson, SC || W 10–9 || Hennessy (4–1) || Shuster (4–4) || None || 4,544 || 33–22 || 15–14
|-bgcolor=ffbbb
| May 18 || Wake Forest ||  || Doug Kingsmore Stadium • Clemson, SC || L 5–14 || Cusick (7–3) || Sharpe (6–4) || None || 4,660 || 33–23 || 15–15
|-

|-
! style="" | Postseason
|- 

|- bgcolor=ffbbb
| May 21 || Boston College ||  || Durham Bulls Athletic Park • Durham, NC || L 5–7 (11) || Walsh (5–6) || Spiers (2–5) || None || 2,490 || 33–24 || 0–1
|- bgcolor=ccffcc
| May 23 || No. 7 Louisville ||  || Durham Bulls Athletic Park • Durham, NC || W 7–1 || Clark (9–2) || Detmers (11–3) || None || 2,577 || 34–24 || 1–1
|-

|- bgcolor=ccffcc
| May 31 || 2 ||  || 3 || Swayze Field • Oxford, MS || W 8–4 || Sharpe (7–4) || Weber (4–3) || None || 8,935 || 35–24 || 1–0
|- bgcolor=ffbbb
| June 1 || 1 || No. 29 Ole Miss || 3 || Swayze Field • Oxford, MS || L 1–6 || Nikhazy (8–3) || Clark (9–3) || None || 10,037 || 35–25 || 1–1
|- bgcolor=ffbbb
| June 2 || 4 ||  || 3 || Swayze Field • Oxford, MS || L 2–9 || Woods (7–0) || Crawford (1–5)''' || None'' || 8,600 || 35–26 || 1–2
|-

|-
| style="font-size:88%" | Note: All rankings shown are from Collegiate Baseball Poll.

Rankings

References

2010-2019